= 2013 MTV Video Music Awards =

Award ceremony

- Date: Sunday, August 25, 2013
- Location: Barclays Center (Brooklyn, New York City)
- Country: United States

Highlights
- Most awards: Justin Timberlake (4)
- Most nominations: Justin Timberlake and Macklemore & Ryan Lewis (6 each)
- Website: www.mtv.com/vma/2013/

Television/radio coverage
- Network: MTV
- Produced by: Amy Doyle; Garrett English; Jesse Ignjatovic; Dave Sirulnick
- Directed by: Hamish Hamilton

The 2013 MTV Video Music Awards were held on August 25, 2013, at the Barclays Center in Brooklyn, New York. Marking the 30th installment of the award show, they were the first to be held in New York City not to use a venue within the borough of Manhattan. Nominations were announced on July 17, 2013. Leading the nominees were Justin Timberlake and Macklemore & Ryan Lewis with six, followed by Bruno Mars, Miley Cyrus, and Robin Thicke with four. Pop singer Justin Timberlake was the big winner on the night with four awards, including Video of the Year for "Mirrors" and the Michael Jackson Vanguard Award. Macklemore & Ryan Lewis, Bruno Mars and Taylor Swift were also among the winners of the night. The ceremony drew a total of 10.1 million viewers.

The show featured Miley Cyrus and Robin Thicke's raunchy and sexually-driven performance for the medley of their songs "We Can't Stop" and "Blurred Lines", which received negative reactions from critics and mixed reactions from fans and fellow celebrities. The most watched performance of the night was Justin Timberlake's 15-minute medley number, which included a brief reunion with NSYNC, leading up to his acceptance speech for the Michael Jackson Video Vanguard Award.

== Performances ==
Artist(s)	Song(s)
Pre-show
Austin Mahone	"What About Love"
Ariana Grande	"Baby I" "The Way"
Main show
Lady Gaga	"Applause"
Miley Cyrus; Robin Thicke; 2 Chainz; Kendrick Lamar	"We Can't Stop" (Cyrus) "Blurred Lines" (Thicke and Cyrus) "Give It 2 U"
Kanye West	"Blood on the Leaves"
Justin Timberlake	Michael Jackson Video Vanguard Medley: 1. "Take Back the Night"; 2. "SexyBack"; 3. "Like I Love You"; 4. "My Love"; 5. "Cry Me a River" (contains elements of "What Goes Around... Comes Around"); 6. "Señorita"; 7. "Rock Your Body" (contains elements of "Let the Groove Get In" and "FutureSex/LoveSound"); 8. Interlude (contains extracts of "Pusher Love Girl" and "Gone"); 9. "Girlfriend" (with NSYNC); 10. "Bye Bye Bye" (with NSYNC); 11. "Suit & Tie"; 12. "Mirrors"
Macklemore & Ryan Lewis; Mary Lambert; Jennifer Hudson	"Same Love"
Drake	"Hold On, We're Going Home" "Started from the Bottom"
Bruno Mars	"Gorilla"
Katy Perry	"Roar" (performed in Empire – Fulton Ferry Park)

House artist

- DJ Cassidy

== Presenters ==
List of presenters:

- Sway, Christina Garibaldi, James Montgomery – Pre-Show
- One Direction – presented Best Pop Video
- Shailene Woodley and Vanessa Bayer (as Miley Cyrus) – introduced Miley Cyrus and Robin Thicke
- Iggy Azalea and Lil' Kim – presented Best Hip-Hop Video
- Kevin Hart – performed a stand-up comedy routine and spoke about Artist to Watch voting procedures
- Jared Leto – introduced Kanye West
- Daft Punk, Nile Rodgers and Pharrell Williams – presented Best Female Video
- Ed Sheeran – presented Best Video with a Social Message
- Jimmy Fallon – presented Video Vanguard Award
- Vampire Weekend – presented Best Song of the Summer
- ASAP Rocky and Jason Collins – introduced Macklemore, Ryan Lewis and Mary Lambert
- Emeli Sandé and Adam Lambert – presented Artist to Watch
- TLC (T-Boz and Chilli) – introduced Drake
- Taylor Swift – presented Best Male Video
- Selena Gomez – introduced Bruno Mars
- Joseph Gordon-Levitt – presented Video of the Year
- Allison Williams – introduced Katy Perry

== Winners and nominees ==
Nominees were announced on July 17, 2013. Winners were announced on August 25, 2013.

Video of the Year	Best Male Video
Justin Timberlake – "Mirrors"; Macklemore and Ryan Lewis (featuring Wanz) – "Thrift Shop"; Bruno Mars – "Locked Out of Heaven"; Taylor Swift – "I Knew You Were Trouble"; Robin Thicke (featuring T.I. and Pharrell) – "Blurred Lines"	Bruno Mars – "Locked Out of Heaven"; Kendrick Lamar – "Swimming Pools (Drank)"; Ed Sheeran – "Lego House"; Robin Thicke (featuring T.I. and Pharrell) – "Blurred Lines"; Justin Timberlake – "Mirrors"
Best Female Video	Artist to Watch
Taylor Swift – "I Knew You Were Trouble"; Miley Cyrus – "We Can't Stop"; Demi Lovato – "Heart Attack"; Pink (featuring Nate Ruess) – "Just Give Me a Reason"; Rihanna (featuring Mikky Ekko) – "Stay"	Austin Mahone – "What About Love"; Iggy Azalea – "Work"; Twenty One Pilots – "Holding On to You"; The Weeknd – "Wicked Games"; Zedd (featuring Foxes) – "Clarity"
Best Pop Video	Best Rock Video
Selena Gomez – "Come & Get It"; Miley Cyrus – "We Can't Stop"; fun. – "Carry On"; Bruno Mars – "Locked Out of Heaven"; Justin Timberlake – "Mirrors"	Thirty Seconds to Mars – "Up in the Air"; Fall Out Boy – "My Songs Know What You Did in the Dark (Light Em Up)"; Imagine Dragons – "Radioactive"; Mumford & Sons – "I Will Wait"; Vampire Weekend – "Diane Young"
Best Hip-Hop Video	Best Collaboration
Macklemore and Ryan Lewis (featuring Ray Dalton) – "Can't Hold Us"; A$AP Rocky (featuring 2 Chainz, Drake and Kendrick Lamar) – "Fuckin' Problems"; J. Cole (featuring Miguel) – "Power Trip"; Drake – "Started from the Bottom"; Kendrick Lamar – "Swimming Pools (Drank)"	Pink (featuring Nate Ruess) – "Just Give Me a Reason"; Calvin Harris (featuring Ellie Goulding) – "I Need Your Love"; Pitbull (featuring Christina Aguilera) – "Feel This Moment"; Robin Thicke (featuring T.I. and Pharrell) – "Blurred Lines"; Justin Timberlake (featuring Jay-Z) – "Suit & Tie"
Best Direction	Best Choreography
Justin Timberlake (featuring Jay-Z) – "Suit & Tie" (Director: David Fincher); Drake – "Started from the Bottom" (Directors: Director X and Drake); Fun. – "Carry On" (Director: Anthony Mandler); Macklemore and Ryan Lewis (featuring Ray Dalton) – "Can't Hold Us" (Directors: Ryan Lewis, Jason Koenig and Jon Jon Augustavo); Yeah Yeah Yeahs – "Sacrilege" (Director: Megaforce)	Bruno Mars – "Treasure" (Choreographer: Bruno Mars); Chris Brown – "Fine China" (Choreographers: Richmond Talauega, Anthony Talauega and Anwar "Flii" Burton); Ciara – "Body Party" (Choreographer: Jamaica Craft); Jennifer Lopez (featuring Pitbull) – "Live It Up" (Choreographers: J.R. Taylor and Beau Smart); will.i.am (featuring Justin Bieber) – "#thatPOWER" (Choreographers: Fatima Robinson and Ryo Noguchi)
Best Visual Effects	Best Art Direction
Capital Cities – "Safe and Sound" (Visual Effects: Grady Hall, Jonathan Wu and Derek Johnson); Duck Sauce – "It's You" (Visual Effects: Royal Post / Paris); Flying Lotus – "Tiny Tortures" (Visual Effects: Dustin Bowser); Skrillex (featuring The Doors) – "Breakn' a Sweat" (Visual Effects: Bonnie Brae, BEMO, Jeff Dotson and Erik Lee); The Weeknd – "Wicked Games" (Visual Effects: Drop and Abel)	Janelle Monáe (featuring Erykah Badu) – "Q.U.E.E.N." (Art Director: Veronica Logsdon); Alt-J – "Tessellate" (Art Director: Charlie Lambros); Capital Cities – "Safe and Sound" (Art Director: Teri Whittaker); Lana Del Rey – "National Anthem" (Art Director: Lou Asaro); Thirty Seconds to Mars – "Up in the Air" (Art Director: Floyd Albee)
Best Editing	Best Cinematography
Justin Timberlake – "Mirrors" (Editors: Jarrett Fijal and Bonch LA); Miley Cyrus – "We Can't Stop" (Editors: Paul Martinez and Nick Rondeau); Calvin Harris (featuring Florence Welch) – "Sweet Nothing" (Editors: Vincent Haycock and Ross Hallard); Macklemore and Ryan Lewis (featuring Ray Dalton) – "Can't Hold Us" (Editors: Ryan Lewis and Jason Koenig); Pink (featuring Nate Ruess) – "Just Give Me a Reason" (Editor: Jackie London at Sunset Edit)	Macklemore and Ryan Lewis (featuring Ray Dalton) – "Can't Hold Us" (Directors of Photography: Jason Koenig, Ryan Lewis and Mego Lin); A-Trak and Tommy Trash – "Tuna Melt" (Directors of Photography: TS Pfeffer and Robert McHugh); Lana Del Rey – "Ride" (Director of Photography: Malik Sayeed); Thirty Seconds to Mars – "Up in the Air" (Director of Photography: David Devlin); Yeah Yeah Yeahs – "Sacrilege" (Director of Photography: Alexis Zabé)
Best Video with a Social Message	Best Song of the Summer
Macklemore and Ryan Lewis (featuring Mary Lambert) – "Same Love"; Beyoncé – "I Was Here"; Kelly Clarkson – "People Like Us"; Miguel – "Candles in the Sun"; Snoop Lion (featuring Drake and Cori B.) – "No Guns Allowed"	One Direction – "Best Song Ever"; Miley Cyrus – "We Can't Stop"; Daft Punk (featuring Pharrell Williams) – "Get Lucky"; Selena Gomez – "Come & Get It"; Calvin Harris (featuring Ellie Goulding) – "I Need Your Love"; Robin Thicke (featuring T.I. and Pharrell) – "Blurred Lines"
Best Latino Artist
Daddy Yankee; Don Omar; Jesse & Joy; Pitbull; Alejandro Sanz
Michael Jackson Video Vanguard Award
Justin Timberlake

== Artists with multiple wins and nominations ==
Artists who received multiple awards
Wins	Artist
4	Justin Timberlake
3	Macklemore & Ryan Lewis
2	Bruno Mars

Artists who received multiple nominations
Nominations	Artist
6	Justin Timberlake
6	Macklemore & Ryan Lewis
4	Bruno Mars
4	Miley Cyrus
4	Robin Thicke
3	Calvin Harris
3	Pink
3	Thirty Seconds to Mars
2	Capital Cities
2	Drake
2	fun.
2	Kendrick Lamar
2	Lana Del Rey
2	Pitbull
2	Selena Gomez
2	Taylor Swift
2	The Weeknd
2	Yeah Yeah Yeahs

== Music Videos with multiple wins and nominations ==
Music Videos that received multiple awards
Wins	Artist	Music Video
2	Justin Timberlake	"Mirrors"
2	Macklemore and Ryan Lewis (featuring Ray Dalton)	"Can't Hold Us"

Music Videos that received multiple nominations
Nominations	Artist	Music Video
4	Justin Timberlake	"Mirrors"
4	Macklemore and Ryan Lewis (featuring Ray Dalton)	"Can't Hold Us"
4	Miley Cyrus	"We Can't Stop"
4	Robin Thicke (featuring T.I. and Pharrell)	"Blurred Lines"
3	Bruno Mars	"Locked Out of Heaven"
3	Pink (featuring Nate Ruess)	"Just Give Me a Reason"
3	Thirty Seconds to Mars	"Up in the Air"
2	Calvin Harris (featuring Ellie Goulding)	"I Need Your Love"
2	Capital Cities	"Safe and Sound"
2	Drake	"Started from the Bottom"
2	fun.	"Carry On"
2	Justin Timberlake (featuring Jay-Z)	"Suit & Tie"
2	Kendrick Lamar	"Swimming Pools (Drank)"
2	Selena Gomez	"Come & Get It"
2	Taylor Swift	"I Knew You Were Trouble"
2	The Weeknd	"Wicked Games"
2	Yeah Yeah Yeahs	"Sacrilege"

== Controversy ==
Pop singer Miley Cyrus became the subject of widespread media attention following a controversial performance with Robin Thicke. The performance began with Cyrus performing "We Can't Stop" in bear-themed attire. Following this, Thicke entered the stage and Cyrus stripped down to a flesh-colored two-piece latex outfit while they performed "Blurred Lines" in a duet. Cyrus subsequently touched Thicke's crotch area with a giant manicured foam finger and twerked against him.

Critics broadly panned the performance, while fans and celebrities were shocked. Parents expressed outrage over the performance. An article published in The Hollywood Reporter described the performance as "crass" and "reminiscent of a bad acid trip". The performance was described by XXL critic B. J. Steiner as a "trainwreck in the classic sense of the word as the audience reaction seemed to be a mix of confusion, dismay and horror in a cocktail of embarrassment", while the BBC said Cyrus stole the show with a "raunchy performance". Katy Kroll of Rolling Stone magazine wrote in 2014, "there were dancing teddy bears, an overused foam finger, an unflattering flesh-colored bikini, some very obvious groping and twerking – lots and lots of twerking. For lack of a better term, it was a hot mess." A Telegraph article described Cyrus' actions as her going into "overdrive [...] trying to kill off her Disney millstone, Hannah Montana". The performance generated 306,100 tweets per minute on Twitter, Cyrus' performance resulted in a gain of over 213,000 Twitter followers, 226,000 likes on Facebook, and 90,000 downloads of her new single, "Wrecking Ball", within days of the controversial performance. This amounted to a total 112% increase in Cyrus' social media activity. The performance topped Twitter during the East Coast telecast, with Timberlake behind with 219,800 tweets per minute at its peak. The most-mentioned performers on Twitter were Cyrus (4.5 million), Timberlake (2.9 million) and Lady Gaga (1.9 million).

== See also ==
- 2013 MTV Europe Music Awards
