= The Rangehoods =

American rock band

- Origin: Seattle, Washington
- Genres: Power pop; hard rock
- Years active: 1984–1992, 1993–1996, 2014–2015
- Labels: Exploding Records; Big D Records
- Past members: Steve Aliment; Bruce Hewes; Pat Hewitt; Don Kammerer; Tony Lease; Steve Pearson; Billy Shaw; Mike Wansley; Marc Willett

The Rangehoods were an American rock band formed in Seattle, Washington in 1984. The group released one EP titled Rough Town in 1985 under Big D Records, and released it on cassette in 1985 under Exploding records. In 1991 they released their only studio album, Long Way Home under the same record company. The band started out under the name The Pins, but renamed to The Rangehoods after guitarist and lead singer Steve Pearson joined (formerly being lead singer of The Heats).

The band opened for Tom Petty and the Heartbreakers on at least one occasion in the early 1990s, and after a series of events, the Rangehoods' bassist (Bruce Hewes) tore up Tom Petty's road manager's business card. Not too long after, Tom Petty's Manager offered to buy the rights to one of their songs, to which Steve Pearson responded that they were not interested. The band broke up after a showcase in Los Angeles in 1996. Mike Wansley, the band's bassist after Bruce Hewes (as well as back-up vocalist), would go on to have a successful musical career under the stage name "Wanz" — being featured in Macklemore & Ryan Lewis's hit single, "Thrift Shop".

== Membership ==
=== Past members ===
Name	Instrument
Steve Aliment	Bass (1993-1995; 2014-2015), Back-up vocals (1991-1995; 2014-2015)
Bruce Hewes	Bass, Vocals (1986-1992)
Pat Hewitt	Lead Guitar, Vocals (1984-2015)
Don Kammerer	Drums (1984-1993?)
Tony Lease	Bass (1984-1985)
Steve Pearson	Lead Vocals, Guitar (1984-2015)
Billy Shaw	Drums (1993?-1996)
Mike Wansley	Bass (1985-1986), Back-up vocals (1985-1992?)
Marc Willett	Bass (1995?-1996)

== Discography ==
- Rough Town (1984) (EP)
  (Released on cassette in 1985)
- Long Way Home (1991) (album)

=== Other appearances ===
- Miller Music II (1986; promotional album; multiple artists; RCA)
- First Draft: The Miller Genuine Draft Band Network Album (1987; multiple artists; RCA)
