= Arrows (song) =

Single by Fences featuring Macklemore & Ryan Lewis

from the album Lesser Oceans
- B-side: "Brass Band"
- Released: July 29, 2014
- Recorded: 2014
- Length: 3:55
- Label: Elektra
- Songwriter(s): Christopher M. Mansfield; Ryan Lewis; Ben Haggerty; Benjamin J. Greenspan
- Producer(s): Ryan Lewis

Fences singles chronology
"The Same Tattoos" (2010)	"Arrows" (2014)	"Songs About Angels" (2014)

Macklemore & Ryan Lewis singles chronology
"White Walls" (2013)	"Arrows" (2014)	"Downtown" (2015)

Music video
- "Arrows" on YouTube

"Arrows" is a song by American indie rock artist Fences, pen name of singer Christopher Mansfield. The song features American hip hop duo Macklemore & Ryan Lewis. It was released on July 29, 2014, coinciding with Mansfield's announcement of the release of the debut Fences studio album Lesser Oceans on January 13, 2015. The single topped Billboard magazine's Emerging Artists chart and has also peaked at number 33 in Australia.

== Music video ==
The song's music video was directed by Jason Koenig and John Keatley and produced by StraightEIGHT Films, based on a concept written and created by Koenig with Macklemore & Ryan Lewis and Chris Mansfield.

== Track listing ==
Digital download

1. "Arrows" (featuring Macklemore & Ryan Lewis) – 3:55

CD single (Germany)

1. "Arrows" (featuring Macklemore & Ryan Lewis) – 3:55
2. "Brass Band" – 3:29

== Charts ==
Chart (2014–15)	Peak position
Australia (ARIA)	31
Austria (Ö3 Austria Top 40)	19
Czech Republic (Singles Digitál Top 100)	46
Germany (GfK)	8
Slovakia (Singles Digitál Top 100)	50
US Hot Rock Songs (Billboard)	24

== Release history ==
Region	Date	Format	Label
New Zealand	July 29, 2014	Digital download	WEA International
United States	August 11, 2014	Adult album alternative radio	Elektra; Atlantic
United States	August 11, 2014	Modern rock radio	Elektra; Atlantic
Germany	September 19, 2014	Compact disc	Atlantic
United States	December 2, 2014	7" vinyl	Elektra
