= The Heist (album) =

Studio album by Macklemore & Ryan Lewis
- Released: October 9, 2012
- Recorded: 2009–2012
- Studios: Avast Recording Co. (Seattle); Haggerty Household (Seattle); Macklemore/Ryan Lewis Studios (Seattle); Perfect Sound Studios (Seattle); Studio X (Seattle)
- Genres: West Coast hip-hop; alternative hip-hop; pop rap
- Length: 64:09
- Labels: Macklemore LLC; ADA
- Producer: Ryan Lewis

Macklemore & Ryan Lewis chronology
The Vs. Redux (2010)	The Heist (2012)	This Unruly Mess I've Made (2016)

Singles from The Heist
- 1. "Wings" Released: January 21, 2011; 2. "Can't Hold Us" Released: August 16, 2011; 3. "Same Love" Released: July 18, 2012; 4. "Thrift Shop" Released: August 27, 2012; 5. "Can't Hold Us" Released: January 24, 2013 (re-release); 6. "White Walls" Released: October 8, 2013

The Heist is the debut studio album by American hip hop duo Macklemore & Ryan Lewis. It was released on October 9, 2012, by Macklemore LLC, distributed under the Alternative Distribution Alliance. The album was independently self-produced, self-recorded, and self-released by the duo, with no mainstream promotion or support. After the album's release, the duo hired Warner Music Group's radio promotion department to help the push with their singles for a small percentage of the sales.

The album was recorded in Seattle, Washington between 2009 and 2012. Four singles were released before the album; the fourth single, "Thrift Shop", was the most commercially successful – peaking at number one on the Billboard Hot 100 and in 17 other countries, including in Australia and New Zealand, as well as a successful run on the charts in many other countries. The album's second single "Can't Hold Us" was also largely commercially successful, peaking at number one in the United States, Australia, and Sweden.

The album sold 78,000 copies in its first week, debuting at number two on the Billboard 200, and at number one on the Billboard Top R&B/Hip-Hop Albums, while entering the Canadian Albums Chart at number four. The album received generally positive reviews from critics. On January 26, 2014, it won the Grammy Award for Best Rap Album, where it was also nominated for Album of the Year and earned Macklemore and Ryan Lewis the award for Best New Artist. As of early 2016, the album has sold 1,490,000 copies in the United States.

== Background ==
In July 2012, Macklemore and Ryan Lewis announced that their full-length debut album will be titled The Heist, and it would be released on October 9, 2012, as well as a subsequent world tour to promote the release. On July 18, 2012, the duo released the Mary Lambert-assisted single "Same Love", in support of Washington state's Referendum 74 regarding gay marriage. It was announced that the song would be included on the album, as were previously released singles "Wings" and "Can't Hold Us." In an interview with The Sermon's Domain, Macklemore confirmed a collaboration with Schoolboy Q on a song about Cadillacs called "White Walls." The song titled "Jimmy Iovine" featuring Ab-Soul was also confirmed. On September 4, 2012, Macklemore and Ryan Lewis released a video promoting the deluxe edition of The Heist, showing it as a box made out of faux-gator skin.

== Singles ==
The official debut single, "Wings" was released on January 21, 2011. It was produced by Ryan Lewis. The song reached at number 40 on the Hot R&B/Hip-Hop Songs, and number 12 on the Billboard's Bubbling Under Hot 100 Singles chart.

The album's second single, "Can't Hold Us" featuring Ray Dalton, was released on August 16, 2011. The track eventually caught the attention of Sean Lynch, a writer from The Source; who initiated an interview to land Macklemore in the magazine's "Unsigned Hype" column in 2012. It debuted on the Billboard Hot 100 at number 97 for the week ending on February 16, 2013, and peaked at number one on the week of May 18, 2013, and remained there for 5 consecutive weeks, becoming the longest running consecutive number-one of 2013, tied with "Harlem Shake" by Baauer (although both were later bested by Robin Thicke's "Blurred Lines", which remained atop the chart for 12 consecutive weeks). It also peaked at number one on the Hot R&B/Hip-Hop Songs chart. It as well reached at number one in Australia and Belgium.

The album's third single, "Same Love" featuring Mary Lambert, was released on July 18, 2012, and gained significant coverage in the media due to its content supporting same-sex marriage and criticizing homophobia in hip hop culture. "Same Love" debuted at number 99 on the Billboard Hot 100 chart for the week ending February 16, 2013, and peaked at number 11. The single reached number one in Australia in the ARIA Charts and on New Zealand's RIANZ chart.

The album's fourth single, "Thrift Shop" featuring Wanz, was very successful commercially. It was released on August 27, 2012, and peaked on the Billboard Hot 100 at number one for six non-consecutive weeks. "Thrift Shop" has sold over 6 million copies in the United States. "Thrift Shop" also reached the top of the Australian and New Zealand singles charts and was certified 6× Platinum in Australia and 2× Platinum in New Zealand. In Canada, it reached at number one on the Canadian Hot 100. The single has also become a veritable international hit, charting in many European singles charts; including Austria, Denmark, France, Finland, Germany, Norway, The Netherlands, Sweden and the United Kingdom.

The album's fifth single, "White Walls" featuring guest vocals from fellow rapper Schoolboy Q and singer Hollis, which they was performed the song on The Tonight Show with Jay Leno on August 27, 2013. It was officially released to mainstream radio on October 8, 2013. The song has since peaked at number 15 on the Billboard Hot 100

=== Promotional singles ===
"My Oh My" was released as the album's promotional single on December 21, 2010. The song was included as a bonus track on the album.

== Critical reception ==
Professional ratings
Aggregate scores
Source	Rating
Metacritic	74/100
Review scores
Source	Rating
AllMusic	4/5 stars
The Austin Chronicle	3.5/5 stars
HipHopDX	4.0/5
MSN Music (Expert Witness)	B+
Q	3/5 stars
RapReviews	8.5/10
Rolling Stone	2.5/5 stars
XXL	4/5

The Heist received generally positive reviews from critics. At Metacritic, which assigns a normalized rating out of 100 to reviews from mainstream publications, the album received an average score of 74, based on eight reviews. David Jeffries of AllMusic said, "Macklemore's a mix of all of the above with some distinctive qualities, and with Lewis putting that kaleidoscope style underneath, The Heist winds up a rich combination of fresh and familiar."

Adam Fleischer of XXL praised its originality and production, stating "It's these sort of astute observations on the human condition and keen self-awareness that set this effort apart. That reality, coupled with Ryan Lewis' vast, daring and layered production, makes The Heist a truly beautiful album that challenges musical boundaries." Edwin Ortiz of HipHopDX saying the album was "An exemplary balance of serious and cheerful cuts alike, very seldom does The Heist reach beyond its means. And when it does, it's more so due to lack of creative placement than effort." Jody Rosen of Rolling Stone said, "The record has its charms (the single "Thrift Shop", a cheeky ode to second-hand duds) and its virtues (the marriage equality anthem "Same Love"). Unfortunately, Macklemore's virtuousness overwhelms his far more modest charms."

In his Barnes & Noble list, Robert Christgau named The Heist as the seventy-second best album of 2012.

== Commercial performance ==
The Heist debuted at number two on the Billboard 200 chart, behind only Mumford & Sons's Babel and sold 78,000 copies in its first week, marking the best sales week yet for both Macklemore and Lewis. It went number one on the ITunes Charts, beating MellowHype’s Numbers album. 83% of the first-week sales derived from digital download. On April 3, 2013, it was announced that the album has reached Gold status, with over 500,000 copies sold. As of February 2016, it has sold 1,490,000 copies domestically. It also debuted at number four on the Canadian Albums Chart.

== Track listing ==
All songs produced by Ryan Lewis.

No.	Title	Writer(s)	Length
1.	"Ten Thousand Hours"	Ben Haggerty; Ryan Lewis; Chris Mansfield	4:09
2.	"Can't Hold Us" (featuring Ray Dalton)	Haggerty; Lewis; Ray Dalton	4:18
3.	"Thrift Shop" (featuring Wanz)	Haggerty; Lewis; Michael Wansley	3:57
4.	"Thin Line" (featuring Buffalo Madonna)	Haggerty; Lewis; Nate Quiroga	4:16
5.	"Same Love" (featuring Mary Lambert)	Haggerty; Lewis; Mary Lambert	5:20
6.	"Make the Money"	Haggerty; Lewis	3:44
7.	"Neon Cathedral" (featuring Allen Stone)	Haggerty; Lewis; Allen Stone	4:34
8.	"BomBom" (featuring The Teaching)	Lewis	4:55
9.	"White Walls" (featuring Schoolboy Q and Hollis)	Haggerty; Lewis; Quincy Hanley; Hollis Wear	3:40
10.	"Jimmy Iovine" (featuring Ab-Soul)	Haggerty; Lewis; Herbert Stevens IV	3:53
11.	"Wings"	Haggerty; Lewis; Wear; Andrew Joslyn	4:59
12.	"A Wake" (featuring Evan Roman)	Haggerty; Lewis; Evan Roman	3:46
13.	"Gold" (featuring Eighty4 Fly)	Haggerty; Lewis; Devon Taylor	4:11
14.	"Starting Over" (featuring Ben Bridwell of Band of Horses)	Haggerty; Lewis; Ben Bridwell	4:11
15.	"Cowboy Boots"	Haggerty; Lewis	4:16
Total length:			64:09

Deluxe edition (bonus tracks)
No.	Title	Writer(s)	Length
16.	"Castle"	Haggerty; Lewis	4:18
17.	"My Oh My" (featuring Dave Niehaus)	Haggerty; Lewis; Dave Niehaus	4:17
18.	"Victory Lap"	Haggerty; Lewis	3:34
Total length:			76:16

== Personnel ==
- Macklemore – lead vocals, main artist
- Ryan Lewis – producer, mixing, electric piano (track 7)
- Elan Wright – bass (tracks 1, 8, 14)
- Lindsey Starr – backing vocals (track 1)
- Ray Dalton – vocals (track 2), backing vocals (tracks 2, 11, 15)
- Greg Kramer – trombone (tracks 2, 5, 17)
- Owuor Arunga – trumpet (tracks 2, 6, 11, 17), backing vocals (track 18)
- Andrew Joslyn – violin (tracks 2, 5, 6, 11, 14, 17), backing vocals (track 15), composer (track 7), viola (track 11), percussion (track 11)
- Victoria Fuangaromya – backing vocals (track 2)
- Tyler Andrews – backing vocals (track 2)
- Camila Recchio – backing vocals (track 2, 11)
- Wanz – vocals (track 3)
- DV One – scratches (track 3)
- Buffalo Madonna – vocals (track 4)
- Mary Lambert – vocals (track 5)
- Natalie Hall – cello (track 5)
- Josh Rawlings – piano (tracks 5 and 8), electric piano (track 7)
- Noah Goldberg – piano (tracks 6, 11 and 17), organ (track 11), electric piano (track 7), backing vocals (track 16)
- Seattle Rock Orchestra – strings (track 7)
- Jeremy Jones – drums, percussion (track 8)
- Evan Flory-Barnes – upright bass (track 8)
- Josh Karp – trumpet (tracks 8 and 14), guitar (track 14), bass (track 16)
- Schoolboy Q – vocals (track 9)
- Hollis – vocals (track 9)
- Ab-Soul – vocals (track 10)
- Zach Fleury – bass (track 11)
- Dana Albaum – cello (tracks 11, 17)
- Sonny Byers – vocals (track 11)
- Denny Middle School Choir – vocals (track 11)
- Evan Roman – vocals (track 12)
- Eighty4 Fly – vocals (track 13)
- Ben Bridwell – vocals (track 14)
- Mark Isakson – banjo (track 15)
- Joshua Rule Dobson – synth (track 16), bass (track 16)

== Charts ==
=== Weekly charts ===
Chart (2012–2013)	Peak position
Australian Albums (ARIA)	2
Austrian Albums (Ö3 Austria)	14
Belgian Albums (Ultratop Flanders)	11
Belgian Albums (Ultratop Wallonia)	17
Canadian Albums (Billboard)	4
Danish Albums (Hitlisten)	25
Dutch Albums (Album Top 100)	18
French Albums (SNEP)	19
German Albums (Offizielle Top 100)	6
Irish Albums (IRMA)	52
Italian Albums (FIMI)	16
New Zealand Albums (RMNZ)	1
Norwegian Albums (VG-lista)	15
Scottish Albums (Official Charts)	21
Spanish Albums (Promusicae)	46
Swedish Albums (Sverigetopplistan)	7
Swiss Albums (Schweizer Hitparade)	10
UK Albums (Official Charts)	19
UK Indie Albums (OCC)	3
UK R&B Albums (OCC)	1
US Billboard 200	2
US Independent Albums (Billboard)	1
US Top R&B/Hip-Hop Albums (Billboard)	1

Chart (2024)	Peak position
Portuguese Albums (AFP)	154

=== Year-end charts ===
Chart (2012)	Position
US Top R&B/Hip-Hop Albums (Billboard)	49
Chart (2013)	Position
Australian Albums (ARIA)	13
Austrian Albums (Ö3 Austria)	42
Belgian Albums (Ultratop Flanders)	36
Belgian Albums (Ultratop Wallonia)	61
Canadian Albums (Billboard)	16
Dutch Albums (Album Top 100)	68
French Albums (SNEP)	49
German Albums (Offizielle Top 100)	38
New Zealand Albums (RMNZ)	10
Swedish Albums (Sverigetopplistan)	48
Swiss Albums (Schweizer Hitparade)	25
UK Albums (OCC)	73
US Billboard 200	15
US Top R&B/Hip-Hop Albums (Billboard)	5
US Top Rap Albums (Billboard)	3
Chart (2014)	Position
Belgian Albums (Ultratop Flanders)	157
Swedish Albums (Sverigetopplistan)	39
US Billboard 200	61
US Top R&B/Hip-Hop Albums (Billboard)	17
Chart (2017)	Position
Swedish Albums (Sverigetopplistan)	93
Chart (2023)	Position
Dutch Albums (Album Top 100)	92
Chart (2024)	Position
Australian Hip Hop/R&B Albums (ARIA)	45

=== Decade-end charts ===
Chart (2010–2019)	Position
Australian Albums (ARIA)	77
US Billboard 200	59

== Certifications ==
Region	Certification	Certified units/sales
Australia (ARIA)	2× Platinum	140,000^{^}
Austria (IFPI Austria)	Gold	7,500^{*}
Canada (Music Canada)	Platinum	80,000^{^}
Denmark (IFPI Danmark)	2× Platinum	40,000^{‡}
France (SNEP)	Platinum	100,000^{*}
Germany (BVMI)	Platinum	200,000^{‡}
Italy (FIMI)	Platinum	50,000^{‡}
New Zealand (RMNZ)	Platinum	15,000^{^}
Norway (IFPI Norway)	Gold	15,000^{*}
Sweden (GLF)	Platinum	40,000^{‡}
Switzerland (IFPI Switzerland)	Gold	15,000^{^}
United Kingdom (BPI)	Platinum	300,000^{‡}
United States (RIAA)	5× Platinum	5,000,000^{‡}
^{*} Sales figures based on certification alone.^{^} Shipments figures based on certification alone.^{‡} Sales+streaming figures based on certification alone.

== See also ==
- List of Billboard 200 number-one independent albums
- List of Billboard number-one R&B albums of 2012
- List of number-one rap albums of 2012 (U.S.)
- List of number-one albums from the 2010s (New Zealand)
- List of Billboard number-one R&B/hip-hop albums of 2013
- List of Billboard number-one rap albums of 2013
- List of Billboard number-one R&B/hip-hop albums of 2014
