= Can't Hold Us =

2011 single by Macklemore & Ryan Lewis

Single by Macklemore & Ryan Lewis featuring Ray Dalton

from the album The Heist
- B-side: "Make the Money" (7-inch); "Wings" (CD)
- Released: August 16, 2011
- Genre: Pop rap; experimental pop; worldbeat
- Length: 4:18 (album version); 3:35 (US radio edit); 5:56 (music video version)
- Label: Macklemore LLC; Elektra
- Songwriters: Ben Haggerty; Ryan Lewis; Ray Dalton
- Producer: Ryan Lewis

Macklemore & Ryan Lewis singles chronology
"Wings" (2011)	"Can't Hold Us" (2011)	"Same Love" (2012)

Ray Dalton singles chronology
"Kingdom Come" (2010)	"Can't Hold Us" (2011)	"Need Your Love" (2012)

Music video
- "Can't Hold Us" on YouTube

Audio sample
- file; help

"Can't Hold Us" is a song written and performed by American hip hop duo Macklemore & Ryan Lewis featuring American singer Ray Dalton, originally released on August 16, 2011, as the second single from the duo's debut album The Heist (2012).

The song was a sleeper hit, gaining more attention in 2012 and 2013, than when it was first released. In May 2013, it reached number one on the Billboard Hot 100, making it their second number-one hit in the United States. It is also their third consecutive number-one single in Australia. The music video was nominated for Best Music Video at the 56th Annual Grammy Awards in 2014. The song was also listed as "The Most-Streamed Song of 2013" by Spotify.

== Composition ==
The song runs and is in the key of E minor, with a fast tempo of 146 beats per minute. The song features tribal percussion, with samples from "Bits and Pieces" by English rock band The Dave Clark Five.

== Critical reception ==
"Can't Hold Us" received critical acclaim. NJ.com named it as "Song of the Week". Lewis Corner of Digital Spy gave the song four stars out of five, praising its "infectious, soul-soaked piano line and beats more vibrant than Rio de Janeiro's finest carnival floats". Writing for The Edge, Hannah Mylrea rated the song 9/10 and complimented the duo's dynamism, deeming it "another massive summer hit". AllMusic's David Jeffries also gave it four stars out of five and wrote: "Macklemore & Ryan Lewis combine the handclapping, foot-stomping, and propulsive rhythms of old-fashioned gospel music with an infectious, uplifting chorus that could have been ripped straight out of will.i.am's playbook...this motivational, "this is the moment" number is identifiably and lovably Macklemore."

== Commercial performance ==
In the United Kingdom, the song debuted in the UK Singles Chart at number 187 on March 17, 2013, climbing up to number 53 the following week. It eventually peaked at number three on the chart. In Australia, "Can't Hold Us" became Macklemore & Ryan Lewis' third consecutive number-one single after "Thrift Shop" and "Same Love", reaching the top of the chart on March 25, 2013. In the United States, the song became a sleeper hit, and following a performance of the song on Saturday Night Live, the song cracked the top 10 at number 7, becoming the duo's second top 10 hit, following the number-one single "Thrift Shop". "Can't Hold Us" reached number one on the Billboard Hot 100 during the chart issue May 18, 2013. They became the first duo to place their two debut singles atop the chart.

Macklemore & Ryan Lewis became the fifth act to place their two debut singles atop the Billboard Hot 100, following Mariah Carey with "Vision of Love" and "Love Takes Time", Christina Aguilera with "Genie in a Bottle" and "What a Girl Wants", Lady Gaga with "Just Dance" and "Poker Face" and Bruno Mars with "Just the Way You Are" and "Grenade". Due to the major international success of the duo's "Thrift Shop", there was a resurgence in sales of their previous singles and their album The Heist. The song stayed at number one for five consecutive weeks before being surpassed by Robin Thicke's "Blurred Lines". As of December 29, 2013, the song had sold 4,383,000 downloads in the United States, with 4,260,000 sold in 2013, making it the eighth best-selling song of the year.

== Music video ==
Macklemore premiered the music video for "Can't Hold Us" on April 17, 2013. The video was directed by Ryan Lewis, Jason Koenig and Jon Jon Augustavo, and shooting took place for 17 days, on 2 continents and 16 different shoots, ranging from the Pacific Northwest to Southern California to New Zealand at Cathedral Cove where scenes for The Chronicles of Narnia: Prince Caspian were also shot. Several prominent parts were filmed on the tall ship Lady Washington.

The video won two MTV Video Music Awards for Best Hip-Hop Video and Director of Photography Jason Koenig, and Mego Lin won Best Cinematography, the video was nominated for Best Direction and Best Editing Nomination to Jason Koenig and Ryan Lewis. It also was placed at No. 12 on BET Notarized Top 100 in 2013. It was nominated for Best Music Video at the 2014 Grammy Awards. It reached 1 billion views in December 2022.

== Usage in media ==
"Can't Hold Us" was used extensively at sporting events in Macklemore's hometown of Seattle. During the 2012 Seattle Seahawks season, the song became the official touchdown song for the team thanks to big fan coach Pete Carroll. Macklemore and Ryan Lewis, also big supporters of the Seahawks, performed "Can't Hold Us" along with "Thrift Shop" during the NFC Championship game halftime show at CenturyLink Field on January 19, 2014.

In 2013, Macklemore objected to the Oklahoma City Thunder using the song during games since the team controversially relocated from Seattle in 2008 when they were the Seattle SuperSonics. "Can't Hold Us" was used by the Seattle Mariners during the seventh inning stretch at T-Mobile Park from 2022–2024. The Mariners stopped using the song in 2024 after Macklemore made controversial comments at a Palestine Will Live Forever benefit concert. Macklemore had also performed the song at a pregame concert for the 2019 MLS Cup which featured Seattle Sounders FC and was hosted at CenturyLink Field.

In early 2013, the song was used in a U.S. television commercial for Microsoft's Outlook.com webmail service. Macklemore himself performed the song with the Detroit Youth Choir on the season 14 finale of America's Got Talent (The Detroit Youth Choir also performed the song in the audition and the finals. This came after performing with the Ndlovu Youth Choir and Kygo performing his version of the Steve Winwood song "Higher Love" with posthumous vocals from Whitney Houston)

== Track listing ==
- Digital download
  1. "Can't Hold Us" – 4:10
  2. "Can't Hold Us" (instrumental) – 4:10
- 7-inch single
  1. "Can't Hold Us" – 4:10
  2. "Make the Money" – 3:45
- CD single (Germany)
  1. "Can't Hold Us" – 4:10
  2. "Wings" – 3:45.

== Charts ==
=== Weekly charts ===
Weekly chart performance for "Can't Hold Us"
Chart (2011–2014)	Peak position
Australia (ARIA)	1
Austria (Ö3 Austria Top 40)	3
Belgium (Ultratop 50 Flanders)	2
Belgium (Ultratop 50 Wallonia)	2
Brazil (ABPD)	10
Canada Hot 100 (Billboard)	2
CIS Airplay (TopHit)	5
Czech Republic Airplay (ČNS IFPI)	4
Czech Republic Singles Digital (ČNS IFPI)	6
Denmark (Tracklisten)	4
Euro Digital Song Sales (Billboard)	2
Finland (Suomen virallinen lista)	3
France (SNEP)	3
Germany (GfK)	2
Greece Digital Songs (Billboard)	9
Hungary (Dance Top 40)	8
Hungary (Rádiós Top 40)	20
Hungary (Single Top 40)	12
Iceland (Tónlistinn)	16
Ireland (IRMA)	3
Israel International Airplay (Media Forest)	3
Italy (FIMI)	8
Lebanon (Lebanese Top 20)	6
Luxembourg Digital Song Sales (Billboard)	2
Mexico (Billboard Ingles Airplay)	3
Mexico Anglo (Monitor Latino)	12
Netherlands (Dutch Top 40)	4
Netherlands (Single Top 100)	5
New Zealand (Recorded Music NZ)	4
Norway (VG-lista)	4
Poland Airplay (ZPAV)	1
Poland Dance (ZPAV)	14
Portugal (Billboard)	9
Russia Airplay (TopHit)	4
Scottish Singles Sales (Official Charts)	4
Slovakia Airplay (ČNS IFPI)	8
Slovakia Singles Digital (ČNS IFPI)	48
Spain (Promusicae)	18
Sweden (Sverigetopplistan)	1
Switzerland (Schweizer Hitparade)	4
Ukraine Airplay (TopHit)	18
UK Singles (Official Charts)	3
UK Indie (Official Charts)	1
UK Hip Hop/R&B (Official Charts)	1
US Billboard Hot 100	1
US Dance Club Songs (Billboard)	31
US Dance Airplay (Billboard)	5
US Hot R&B/Hip-Hop Songs (Billboard)	1
US Adult Pop Airplay (Billboard)	25
US Pop Airplay (Billboard)	1
US Rhythmic Airplay (Billboard)	1
Venezuela Pop/Rock General (Record Report)	26

Chart (2022–2026)	Peak position
Global 200 (Billboard)	68
Latvia Airplay (TopHit)	82
Luxembourg (Billboard)	24
Poland (Polish Streaming Top 100)	89

=== Monthly charts ===
Monthly chart performance
Chart (2013–2014)	Peak position
CIS Airplay (TopHit)	7
Russia Airplay (TopHit)	6
Ukraine Airplay (TopHit)	59

=== Year-end charts ===
Annual chart rankings for "Can't Hold Us"
Chart (2013)	Position
Australia (ARIA)	9
Austria (Ö3 Austria Top 40)	7
Belgium (Ultratop Flanders)	5
Belgium (Ultratop Wallonia)	9
Canada (Canadian Hot 100)	15
CIS Airplay (TopHit)	103
France (SNEP)	8
Germany (Media Control AG)	6
Hungary (Dance Top 40)	22
Hungary (Rádiós Top 40)	78
Italy (FIMI)	34
Netherlands (Dutch Top 40)	6
Netherlands (Single Top 100)	19
New Zealand (Recorded Music NZ)	12
Russia Airplay (TopHit)	96
Spain (PROMUSICAE)	41
Sweden (Sverigetopplistan)	4
Switzerland (Schweizer Hitparade)	9
UK Singles (OCC)	13
US Billboard Hot 100	5
US Dance/Mix Show Airplay (Billboard)	26
US Hot R&B/Hip-Hop Songs (Billboard)	3
US Rap Songs (Billboard)	2
US Mainstream Top 40 (Billboard)	4
US Rhythmic (Billboard)	2

Chart (2014)	Position
Belgium Urban (Ultratop)	20
CIS Airplay (TopHit)	25
France (SNEP)	122
Hungary (Dance Top 40)	48
Italy (FIMI)	68
Russia Airplay (TopHit)	26
Sweden (Sverigetopplistan)	75
Ukraine Airplay (TopHit)	158

Chart (2020)	Position
France (SNEP)	148

Chart (2021)	Position
France (SNEP)	164

Chart (2022)	Position
Australia (ARIA)	71
Germany (Official German Charts)	82
Global Excl. US (Billboard)	199
Switzerland (Schweizer Hitparade)	42

Chart (2023)	Position
Australia (ARIA)	67
Austria (Ö3 Austria Top 40)	21
Germany (Official German Charts)	67
Global 200 (Billboard)	138
Netherlands (Single Top 100)	62
Switzerland (Schweizer Hitparade)	16

Chart (2024)	Position
France (SNEP)	79
Global 200 (Billboard)	150
Netherlands (Single Top 100)	93
Switzerland (Schweizer Hitparade)	31

Chart (2025)	Position
France (SNEP)	101
Germany (GfK)	81
Switzerland (Schweizer Hitparade)	22

=== Decade-end charts ===
2010s chart rankings for "Can't Hold Us"
Chart (2010–2019)	Position
Australia (ARIA)	33
Germany (Official German Charts)	14
UK Singles (Official Charts Company)	69
US Billboard Hot 100	71
US Hot R&B/Hip-Hop Songs (Billboard)	15

== Certifications ==
Region	Certification	Certified units/sales
Australia (ARIA)	13× Platinum	910,000^{‡}
Austria (IFPI Austria)	6× Platinum	180,000^{*}
Belgium (BRMA)	2× Platinum	60,000^{*}
Canada (Music Canada)	4× Platinum	320,000^{*}
Denmark (IFPI Danmark)	Gold	15,000^{^}
France (SNEP)	Diamond	250,000^{*}
Germany (BVMI)	Platinum	300,000^{^}
Italy (FIMI)	5× Platinum	250,000^{‡}
Mexico (AMPROFON)	Platinum+Gold	90,000^{*}
Netherlands (NVPI)	4× Platinum	80,000^{‡}
New Zealand (RMNZ)	10× Platinum	300,000^{‡}
Portugal (AFP)	5× Platinum	50,000^{‡}
Spain (Promusicae)	4× Platinum	240,000^{‡}
Sweden (GLF)	2× Platinum	80,000^{‡}
Switzerland (IFPI Switzerland)	Platinum	30,000^{^}
United Kingdom (BPI)	6× Platinum	3,600,000^{‡}
United States (RIAA)	Diamond	10,000,000
Streaming
Denmark (IFPI Danmark)	5× Platinum	9,000,000^{†}
Spain (Promusicae)	2× Platinum	16,000,000^{†}
^{*} Sales figures based on certification alone.^{^} Shipments figures based on certification alone.^{‡} Sales+streaming figures based on certification alone.^{†} Streaming-only figures based on certification alone.

== Awards and nominations ==
Year	Ceremony	Award	Result
2013	Teen Choice Awards	Choice R&B/Hip-Hop Song	Won
2013	MTV Video Music Awards	Best Hip-Hop Video	Won
2013	MTV Video Music Awards	Best Direction in a Video	Nominated
2013	MTV Video Music Awards	Best Editing in a Video	Nominated
2013	MTV Video Music Awards	Best Cinematography in a Video	Won
2014	Grammy Awards	Best Music Video	Nominated

== Release history ==
Country	Date	Format	Label	Catalog no.
United States	August 16, 2011	Digital download	Macklemore	—N/a
United States	January 2013	Contemporary hit radio	Elektra	—N/a
France	November 2011	7-inch 45 rpm single	Noiseland	11-0504
Germany	May 24, 2013	CD single	Rykodisc	0825646441426

== See also ==
- List of highest-certified singles in Australia
