= Wanz =

American R&B singer (born 1961)

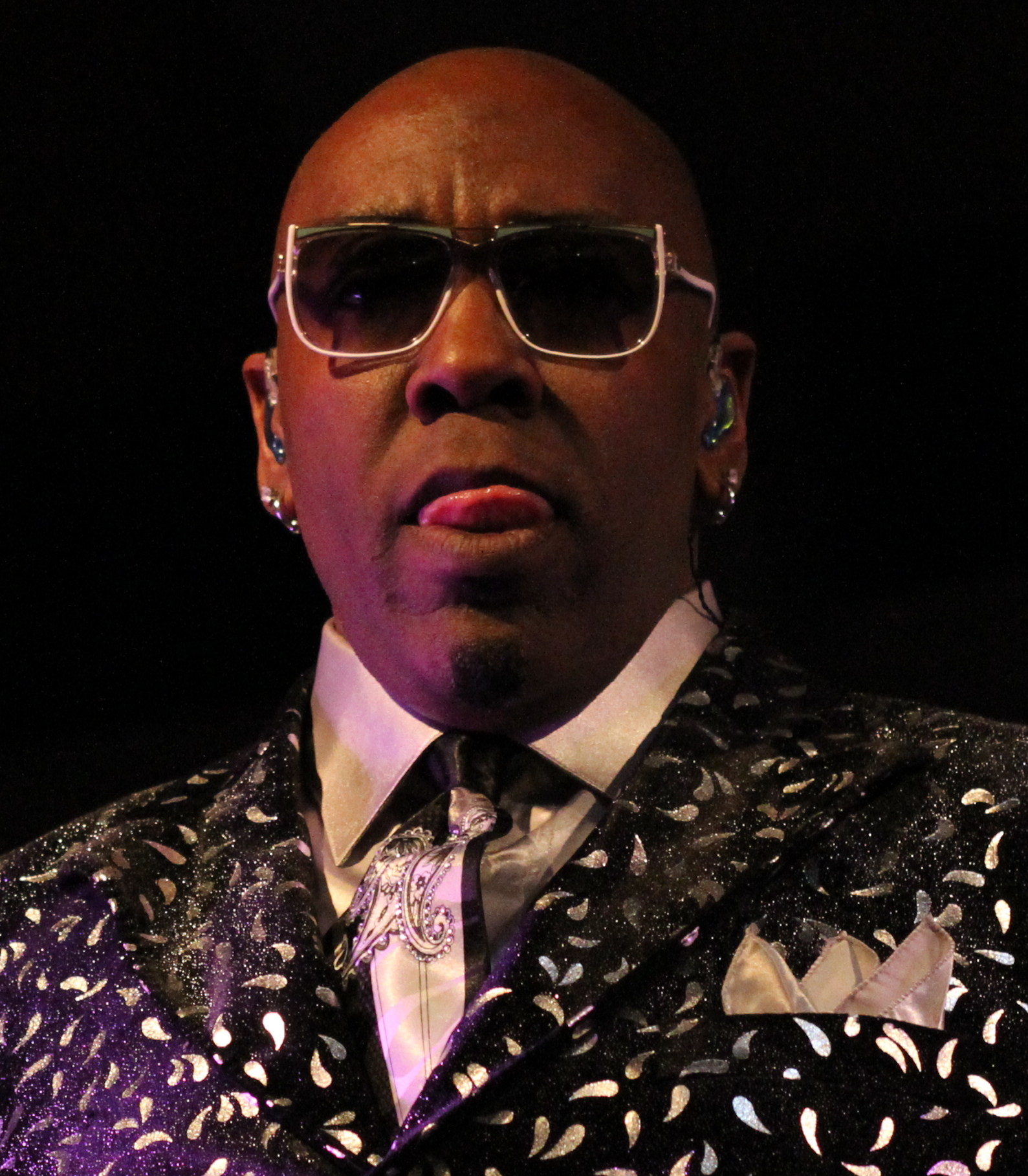
- Wanz at the University of San Francisco, 2013

Background information
- Also known as: TeeWanz
- Born: Michael Wansley; October 9, 1961 (age 64); Seattle, Washington, U.S.
- Genres: R&B; hip-hop
- Occupations: Singer; songwriter
- Instruments: Vocals; bass guitar
- Years active: 1980–present
- Formerly of: The Rangehoods
- Website: thewanz.com

Michael "Mike" Wansley (born October 9, 1961), better known by his stage names Wanz and TeeWanz, is an American R&B singer. He performs in various genres, including rock, R&B, soul, hip-hop, and pop. He was featured on fellow Seattle-based duo Macklemore & Ryan Lewis' international hit single "Thrift Shop", which received two Grammy Awards for Best Rap Performance and Best Rap Song. He is known for having a booming bass voice, specifically a sporadic true bass or a low bass-baritone voice.

== Life and career ==
Wansley started performing in church, school, and on the street. He was introduced to jazz and pop music early and studied jazz at school. He has been performing since the early 1980s. At 21, he formed a band called Boys Will Be Boys. Their repertoire included covers, including INXS songs. In the early 1990s Wansley went on to become the bass player in the Seattle band The Rangehoods, taking over for Bruce Hewes. He also was the bass player and singer for the original hard-funk band, Lifering, with David Scott Cameron on guitar, Jeff Stone on guitar, and David Nielsen on drums. He later on fronted a band called the Ghetto Monks and saw some success. He sang hooks in recordings by D. Sane and Street Level Records for a decade. He also took part in the summer of 2011 in the opera Porgy and Bess.

Wanz graduated from Lakes High School in Lakewood, Washington. Prior to the break-out performance of "Thrift Shop", Wanz was a full-time software test engineer for companies such as Microsoft, Adapx, and Volt. Sane called him and introduced him to Macklemore and Ryan Lewis to do the hook for "Thrift Shop" in 2012. Wanz has toured with Macklemore and Ryan Lewis and performed with them on The Ellen DeGeneres Show, Late Night with Jimmy Fallon and Saturday Night Live. He is also featured in the official music video of the song. Wanz has written a book about a series of sayings he has coined over the years, to be called #The Book of Wanz and has a Ted Talk called "You Too Can Be Your Own Unicorn".

In 2015, Wansley returned to his career as a quality-assurance engineer for the software company Tableau and has been working with at-risk youth and other causes as well as working on new music.

== Discography ==
=== Albums ===
Year	Title
1991	Long Way Home (The Rangehoods)
1999	High Steppin' (Ghetto Monks)

=== Extended play ===
- Wander (2013)

=== Singles ===
Featured in

List of singles, with selected chart positions, showing year released and album name
Title		Peak chart positions										Certifications	Album
Title		US	US Alt.	US R&B	US Rap	AUS	CAN	FRA	GER	IRL	NZ	Certifications	Album
"Thrift Shop" (Macklemore & Ryan Lewis featuring Wanz)	2012	1	1	1	1	1	1	1	2	1	1	ARIA: 9× Platinum; RMNZ: 5× Platinum; RIAA: Diamond	The Heist
"—" denotes a recording that did not chart or was not released in that territory.

=== Appearances ===
- 2003: "Pull with Me" (Dividenz feat. Wanz) (5:24) (on Dividenz album 'Hollow Point Lyrics')
- 2004: "Take This Flight" (Crytical feat. Dividenz & Wanz) (4:16) (on Crytical's album 'Crytical Condition')
- 2006: "Rain" (Dividenz feat. Wanz) (5:15) (on Dividenz album '10% Rap, 90% Hustle')
- 2006: "No Way" (Dividenz feat. Wanz) (4:16) (on Dividenz album '10% Rap, 90% Hustle')
- 2010: "I'm Gon' Preach" (The Competitive Hustle League feat. Wanz) (3:53) (on Competitive Hustle League album 'CHL')
- 2012: "Thrift Shop" (Macklemore and Ryan Lewis feat. Wanz) (3:57) (on Macklemore & Ryan Lewis album The Heist)
- 2014: "Family" (Ridsa feat. Wanz) (3:32) (on Ridsa's album Mes histoires)
- 2014: "To: Nate Dogg" (feat. Warren G, Grynch & Crytical) (3:37)
- 2015: "Still Believe" (J-HAZE feat. Wanz)
- 2018: "Back to Work" (Wizdom feat. Wanz) (3:24)
