= Whitewalls =

Whitewalls may refer to:

- Whitewall tires
- "White Walls", a song by Macklemore & Ryan Lewis
- A shopping street in Swansea City Centre, Wales, United Kingdom
