= White Walls =

Single by Macklemore & Ryan Lewis featuring Schoolboy Q and Hollis

from the album The Heist
- Released: October 8, 2013
- Recorded: 2012
- Genre: Hip hop
- Length: 3:40
- Label: Macklemore LLC; Warner Bros.
- Songwriters: Ben Haggerty; Ryan Lewis; Quincy Hanley; Hollis Wong-Wear
- Producer: Ryan Lewis

Macklemore & Ryan Lewis singles chronology
"Can't Hold Us" (2013)	"White Walls" (2013)	"Arrows" (2014)

Schoolboy Q singles chronology
"Collard Greens" (2013)	"White Walls" (2013)	"Man of the Year" (2013)

Hollis singles chronology
"White Walls" (2013)

"White Walls" is a hip-hop song by an American hip-hop duo Macklemore & Ryan Lewis, taken from their collaborative debut studio album The Heist (2012). The song's hook is performed by singer Hollis, while American rapper Schoolboy Q performs a guest verse. "White Walls" was released to American contemporary hit radio on October 8, 2013, as the fifth and final single from The Heist. The song debuted at number 100 and has since peaked at number 15 on the US Billboard Hot 100 and has sold 1,000,000 copies as of January 2014.

== Release and promotion ==
The song charted at number one on the US Bubbling Under R&B/Hip-Hop Singles prior to its release as a single, due to high digital downloads subsequently after the album's release. Macklemore, Ryan Lewis, Schoolboy Q and Hollis performed "White Walls" on The Tonight Show with Jay Leno on August 27, 2013. The song impacted American contemporary hit radio on October 8, 2013.

In November 2020, "White Walls" went viral on TikTok, being used in many videos.

== Music video ==
The music video, directed by Macklemore, Ryan Lewis and Jason Koenig, was released September 9, 2013. The video features cameo appearances from several rappers including A$AP Rocky, Trinidad Jame$, Wiz Khalifa, Big Boi and Sir Mix-a-Lot, as well as DJ Drama. Parts of the music video are shot inside a Vogue Tyre warehouse, and the eponymous whitewall tires are explicitly mentioned by Macklemore to be Vogues. The video also features several Cadillac models, including an SRX, Escalade, two XLRs, several Eldorados and a Coupe de Ville.

== Charts ==
=== Weekly charts ===
Chart (2013–2014)	Peak position
Australia (ARIA)	34
Austria (Ö3 Austria Top 40)	8
Belgium (Ultratip Bubbling Under Flanders)	2
Belgium (Ultratop Flanders Urban)	18
Belgium (Ultratip Bubbling Under Wallonia)	13
Canada Hot 100 (Billboard)	17
France (SNEP)	65
Germany (GfK)	17
Ireland (IRMA)	30
New Zealand (Recorded Music NZ)	6
Switzerland (Schweizer Hitparade)	32
UK Singles (Official Charts)	26
UK Hip Hop/R&B (Official Charts)	9
US Billboard Hot 100	15
US Hot R&B/Hip-Hop Songs (Billboard)	3
US Pop Airplay (Billboard)	13
US Rhythmic Airplay (Billboard)	4

=== Year-end charts ===
Chart (2013)	Position
US Hot R&B/Hip-Hop Songs (Billboard)	81
US Rhythmic (Billboard)	49
Chart (2014)	Position
Austria (Ö3 Austria Top 40)	55
Canada (Canadian Hot 100)	85
Germany (Official German Charts)	86
US Billboard Hot 100	92
US Hot R&B/Hip-Hop Songs (Billboard)	26
US Rhythmic (Billboard)	35

== Certifications ==
Region	Certification	Certified units/sales
Australia (ARIA)	Gold	35,000^{^}
New Zealand (RMNZ)	2× Platinum	60,000^{‡}
United Kingdom (BPI)	Silver	200,000^{‡}
United States (RIAA)	3× Platinum	3,000,000^{‡}
^{^} Shipments figures based on certification alone.^{‡} Sales+streaming figures based on certification alone.

== Release history ==
Release dates and formats for "White Walls"
Region	Date	Format	Label(s)	Ref.
United States	October 8, 2013	Mainstream airplay	Warner Bros.	
