= Ray Dalton =

American singer (born 1990)

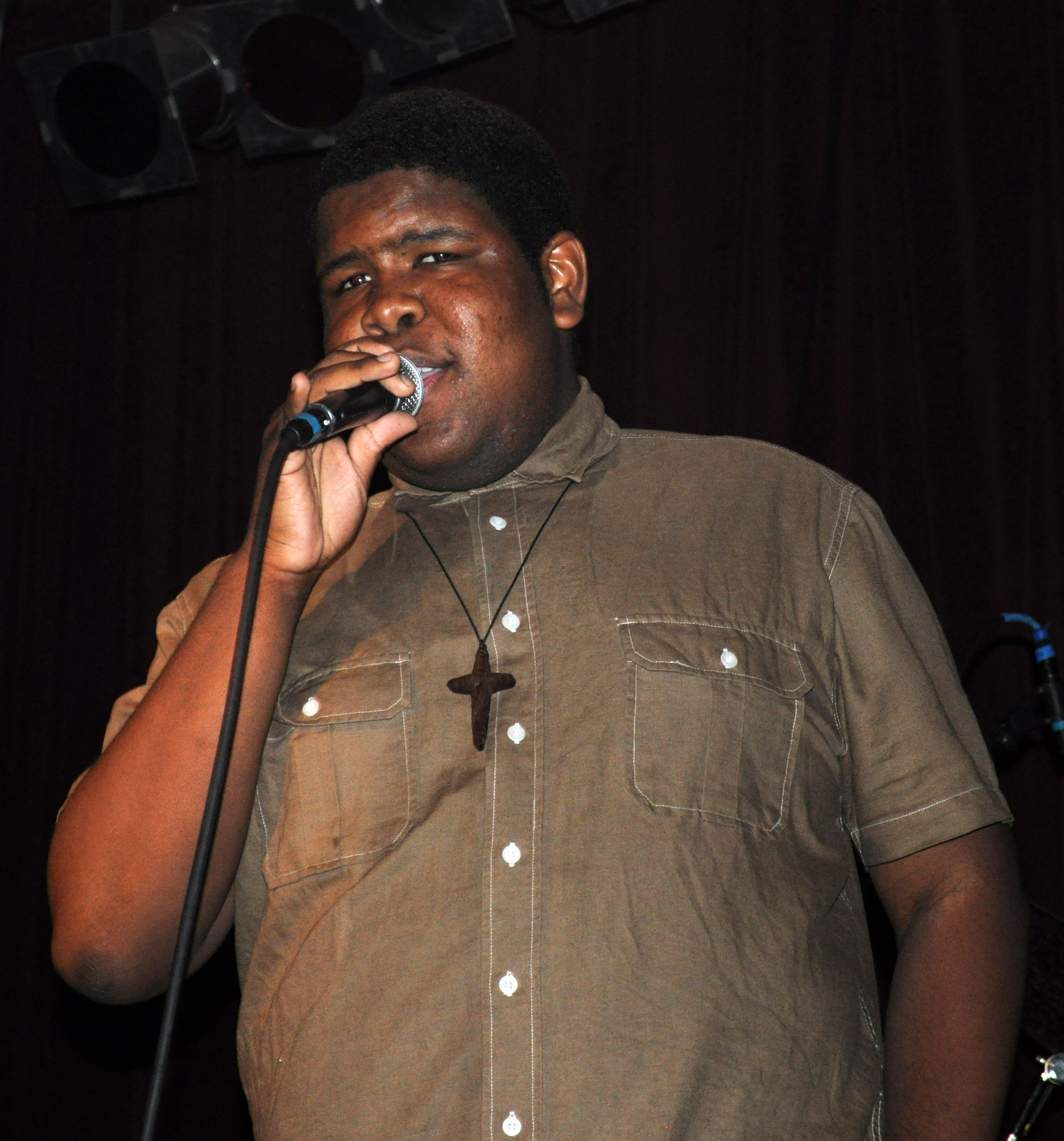
- Dalton in 2010

Background information
- Born: Raymond Adrien Dalton; May 10, 1990 (age 36); San Bernardino, California, U.S.
- Origin: Seattle, Washington
- Genres: R&B; hip hop; gospel
- Occupations: Singer; songwriter
- Years active: 2009–present
- Website: raydalton.com

Raymond Adrien Dalton (born May 10, 1990) is an American singer based in Seattle, Washington. He began his career as a gospel and R&B singer. Dalton gained prominence as the featured artist on Macklemore & Ryan Lewis' 2011 song "Can't Hold Us", which gained popularity between 2012 and 2013, eventually topping the charts in multiple countries including the Billboard Hot 100. The song was certified platinum in the U.S. in April 2013. He has won two MTV Video Music Awards.

== Life and career ==
Dalton's mother is Mexican American and his father is African American. He began singing at the age of 6 on the advice of his music teacher, joining the Seattle Children's Choir. He continued to sing through high school. He has described himself as a fan of Fleetwood Mac. Dalton spent his senior year in high school listening to Missy Elliott, Amy Winehouse, and Kanye West, according to an interview with MTV News.

Aside from music, Dalton is a tennis player who has worked as a tennis instructor. He gave up teaching tennis following the success of "Can't Hold Us" to pursue a full-time career as a musician. Dalton sings in the Total Experience Gospel Choir of Seattle as of 2013.

Dalton's work drew the attention of producer Ryan Lewis, who had heard Dalton's singing on a song for another artist. Lewis reached out to Dalton via Facebook. Dalton soon began collaborating with Lewis and Macklemore in the studio. The first song the trio worked on together was Macklemore and Lewis' 2011 single, "Wings".

In June 2012, Dalton released his first single, "So Emotional", which was mixed by Lewis. He also announced he was working on his "own project" to be called The Dalton Show.

Dalton, Lewis, and Macklemore created the hook for "Can't Hold Us" in one day. Dalton shot his scenes for the single's music video while on tour in New Zealand in March 2013.

== Discography ==
=== Studio albums ===
List of studio albums, with selected certifications
Title	Details	Certifications
Thee Unknown	Released: September 20, 2024; Label: Sony Music, Epic Records Germany; Formats: CD, digital download, streaming	ZPAV: Gold

=== Singles ===
==== As lead artist ====
List of singles as lead artist, with selected chart positions and certifications, showing year released and album name
Title	Year	Peak chart positions										Certifications	Album
Title	Year	AUT	BEL (Fl)	BEL (Wa)	CRO Int. Air.	CZE Air.	EST Air.	GER	POL Air.	SVK Air.	SWI	Certifications	Album
"So Emotional"	2012	—	—	—	—	—	*	—	—	—	—		Non-album singles
"If You Fall"	2017	—	—	—	—	—	*	—	—	—	—		Non-album singles
"Bass Down"	2018	—	—	—	—	—	*	—	—	—	—		Non-album singles
"In My Bones"	2020	—	13	44	26	2	*	—	2	2	—	IFPI AUT: Gold; SNEP: Platinum; ZPAV: Platinum	Thee Unknown
"Good Times Hard Times"	2020	—	—	—	—	—	*	—	—	—	—		Non-album singles
"If You're Tired" (with Connor Duermit)	2020	—	—	—	—	—	*	—	—	—	—		Non-album singles
"Don't Make Me Miss You"	2021	—	— (Note: "Don't Make Me Miss You" did not reach the region's Ultratop 50 chart, but was registered on the Ultratip Bubbling Under ranking.)	— (Note: "Don't Make Me Miss You" did not reach the region's Ultratop 50 chart, but charted at number 28 on the Ultratip Bubbling Under ranking.)	—	—	*	—	15	—	—		Non-album singles
"Melody" (with Vinai)	2021	—	—	—	—	—	*	—	—	—	—		Non-album singles
"Manila" (with Álvaro Soler)	2021	15	—	—	—	—	*	23	37	1	19	BVMI: Gold; IFPI AUT: Gold; IFPI SWI: Gold	Non-album singles
"The Best Is Yet to Come"	2022	—	—	—	—	—	*	—	—	—	—		Non-album singles
"Call It Love" (with Felix Jaehn)	2022	19	22	—	12	4	12	18	3	18	17	ZPAV: 2× Platinum	Thee Unknown
"Do It Again"	2023	—	—	—	38	58	9	—	2	1	—	IFPI AUT: Gold; MAHASZ: Platinum; ZPAV: Platinum	Thee Unknown
"All We Got"	2024	—	—	—	—	—	51	—	17	12	—	ZPAV: Gold	Thee Unknown
"Blood Running"	2025	— (Note: "Blood Running" did not reach the Ö3 Austria Top 40, but peaked at number 16 at the Austrian airplay chart.)	—	—	—	3	—	— (Note: "Blood Running" did not reach the Top 100 Single-Charts, but peaked at number five at the German airplay chart.)	23	1	— (Note: "Blood Running" did not reach the Singles Top 100, but peaked at number 6 at the Swiss airplay chart.)		TBA
"I Just Wanna Be Happy"	2026	—	—	—	—	8	—	—	—	—	—		TBA
"Go That High"	2026	—	34	—	—	10	—	—	—	33	— (Note: "Go That High" did not reach the Single Top 100, but peaked at number 12 at the Swiss airplay chart.)		TBA
"—" denotes releases that did not chart or were not released in that territory. "*" denotes the chart did not exist at that time.

==== As featured artist ====
List of singles as featured artist, with selected chart positions and certifications, showing year released and album name
Title	Year	Peak chart positions											Certifications	Album
Title	Year	US	AUS	BEL (Fl)	BEL (Wa)	DEN	FRA	NOR	NZ	SWE	SWI	UK	Certifications	Album
"Kingdom Come" (Dyno Jamz featuring Ray Dalton)	2010	—	—	—	—	—	—	—	—	—	—	—		Dyno Jamz
"Can't Hold Us" (Macklemore & Ryan Lewis featuring Ray Dalton)	2011	1	1	2	2	4	3	4	4	1	4	3	RIAA: Diamond; ARIA: 13× Platinum; BEA: 2× Platinum; IFPI DEN: 2× Platinum; SNEP: Gold; RMNZ: 2× Platinum; GLF: 2× Platinum; IFPI SWI: Platinum; BPI: 6× Platinum	The Heist
"Whisper" (Camila Recchio featuring Ray Dalton)	2011	—	—	—	—	—	—	—	—	—	—	—		Non-album singles
"Need Your Love" (Sol featuring Ray Dalton)	2012	—	—	—	—	—	—	—	—	—	—	—		Non-album singles
"Visceral" (John Mark McMillan featuring Ray Dalton)	2014	—	—	—	—	—	—	—	—	—	—	—		The Borderland Sessions
"Don't Worry" (Madcon featuring Ray Dalton)	2015	—	82	10	15	5	2	4	28	14	8	54	BEA: Gold; BPI: Silver; IFPI DEN: 2× Platinum; IFPI NOR: 4× Platinum; RMNZ: Gold; GLF: Platinum; IFPI SWI: Platinum	Non-album singles
"Stronger" (Arty featuring Ray Dalton)	2016	—	—	—	—	—	—	—	—	—	—	—		Glorious
"—" denotes releases that did not chart or were not released in that territory.

=== Other charted songs ===
List of other charted songs, with selected chart positions, showing year released and album name
Title	Year	Peak chart positions	Album
Title	Year	CZE Air.	Album
"Thee Unknown"	2024	15	Thee Unknown

=== Guest appearances ===
List of non-single guest appearances, with other performing artists, showing year released and album name
Title	Year	Other artist(s)	Album
"Believe"	2018	Alex Aldea, Camila Recchio	The First Mrs. Claus
