= Fences (band) =

American rock band

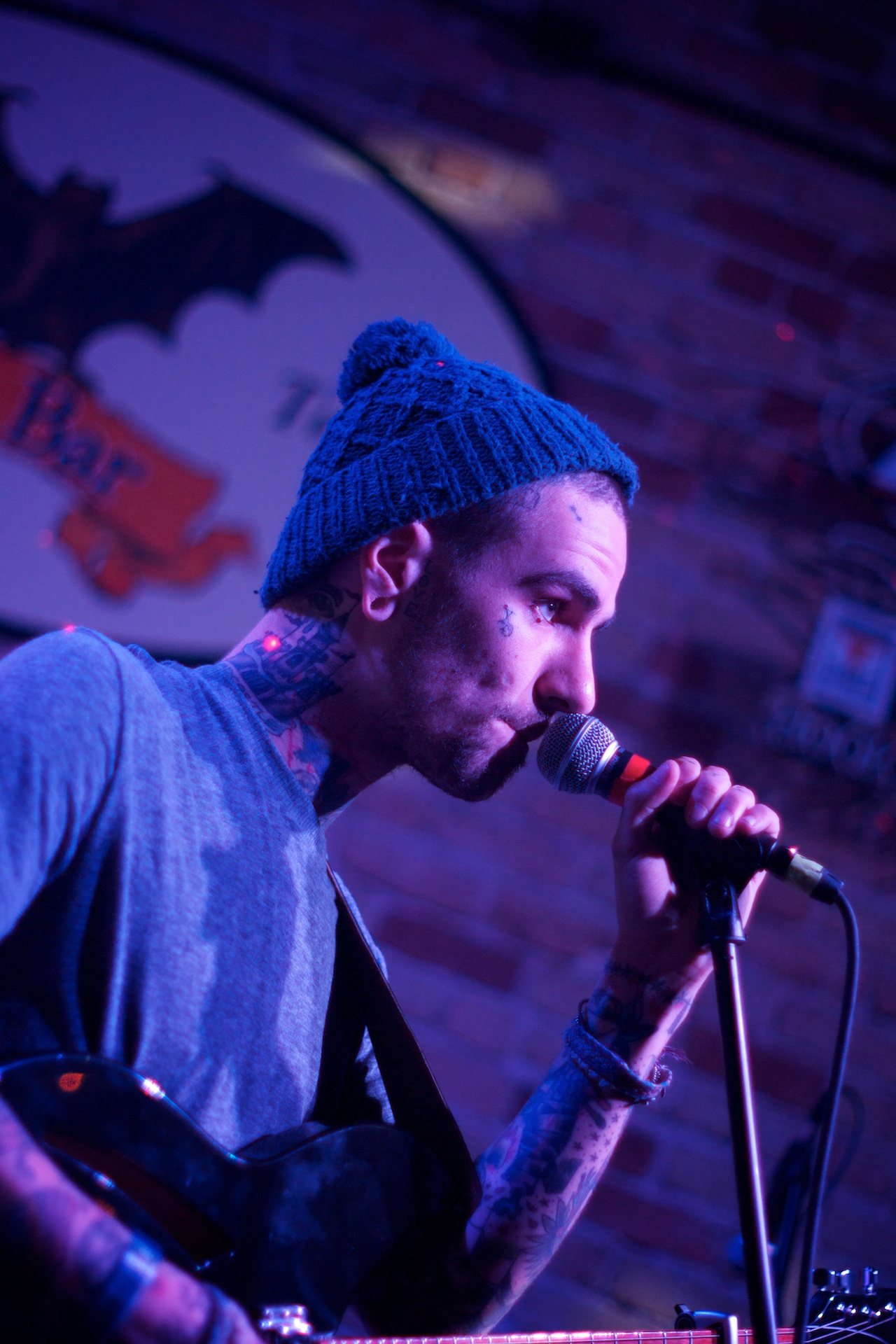
- Christopher Mansfield, singer of American indie rock band Fences, performing at the 2011 SXSW Music festival.

Background information
- Origin: Seattle, Washington
- Genres: Pop rock; alternative rock; indie rock
- Years active: 2010–present
- Members: Christopher Mansfield; Jonah Marc Levine
- Past members: Benjamin Greenspan; Lindsey Starr; Elliott Garm Chaffee
- Website: fencesmusic.com

Fences is an American indie rock band from Seattle, Washington formed by lead vocalist and guitarist Christopher Mansfield, guitarist Benjamin Greenspan, bassist and vocalist Lindsey Starr and drummer Elliott Garm Chaffee. They released their debut studio album Fences in 2010 and Lesser Oceans in 2015.

== History ==
Christopher Mansfield was born in Brockton, Massachusetts, the youngest in a family of ten children. He attended Berklee College of Music.

In 2009, his debut EP, Ultimate Puke, was discovered via Myspace by Sara Quin of popular Canadian indie band Tegan & Sara. Quin ended up producing, recording and adding vocals to his self-titled debut album, Fences, released on September 28, 2010. Fences went on to make the SPIN magazine's year-end list of "Albums You May Have Missed" in 2010.

Mansfield had also caught the attention of Seattle rapper Macklemore, who came across his performance from Songs for eating and drinking, a collective of Seattle musicians who dine together and share music written specifically for that event.

In late 2010 and early 2011, Fences toured in support of punk rock band Against Me! and in July 2011, the band toured with indie pop band Hellogoodbye. In August 2011, Mansfield collaborated with Macklemore & Ryan Lewis on "Otherside" (Remix), and he also co-wrote "Ten Thousand Hours" from Macklemore’s 2012 album The Heist, along with the vocals of Fences bassist Lindsey Starr.

In 2013, Fences was signed to Elektra Records. "When I heard Chris Mansfield's demos for this album, I knew I had to work with him," said Elektra president Jeff Castelaz. "The songs he and Fences cohort Benjamin Greenspan created for Lesser Oceans capture those moments that pass most of us by in our hectic lives."

On July 29, 2014, Mansfield released a new single titled "Arrows" in collaboration with Macklemore & Ryan Lewis, along with the announcement of Lesser Oceans. The single reached number one on Billboard Magazine's Emerging Artists chart. Lesser Oceans was released on March 10, 2015, and features production by Death Cab for Cutie's Chris Walla, Jacquire King (Of Monsters and Men) and Ryan Lewis.

On February 25, 2025, Mansfield and collaborator Jonah Marc Levine released a full-length titled "Prairie Tremens".

== Personal life ==
Christopher Mansfield has openly mentioned his sobriety on his blog and Twitter account. In an interview with a Seattle publication, he discusses the time he spent in rehab, saying "I also came to terms with the fact I cannot drink like other people. I know I put a lot about it in the music of Fences and have an image of being that kind of person. The 'drunk tortured artist.' It is total bullshit! In reality, I was blowing any chances I may have of ever touring or recording a real record or meeting any goals short or long."

== Band members ==
- Christopher Mansfield – vocals, guitar
- Benjamin Greenspan – guitar, keyboard
- Lindsey Starr – bass, vocals
- Elliott Garm Chaffee – drums

== Discography ==
=== Studio albums ===
==== Fences ====
Release date: September 28, 2010

Track listing

No.	Title	Length
1.	"Boys Around Here"	3:04
2.	"Girls With Accents"	2:58
3.	"Hands"	3:13
4.	"My Girl the Horse"	4:31
5.	"Fires"	3:17
6.	"The Same Tattoos"	2:55
7.	"From Roses"	2:57
8.	"Sadie"	3:29
9.	"Your Bones"	3:14
10.	"From Russia With..."	2:26

==== Lesser Oceans ====
Release date: March 10, 2015

Track listing

No.	Title	Length
1.	"Songs About Angels"	3:02
2.	"The Lake"	3:23
3.	"Dogs At the Table"	3:08
4.	"Arrows" (featuring Macklemore & Ryan Lewis)	3:55
5.	"Running Off the Gods"	2:15
6.	"Sunburns"	3:49
7.	"Dusty Beds"	2:43
8.	"My Mountain Is Cold"	4:02
9.	"Lesser Oceans"	3:03
10.	"Temple Dreaming"	4:20

==== FAILURE SCULPTURES ====
Release date: June 21, 2019

Track listing

No.	Title	Length
1.	"A MISSION"	3:30
2.	"PAPER ROUTE"	3:18
3.	"SAME BLUES"	3:10
4.	"BRASS BAND"	3:24
5.	"THE PARK"	3:22
6.	"WOODEN DOVE"	3:29
7.	"FAILURE SCULPTURES"	4:47
8.	"LILLIA"	3:14
9.	"WAR KID"	3:24
10.	"GOD MUSIC"	3:33

==== Bright Soil ====
Release date: September 15, 2023

Track listing

No.	Title	Length
1.	"Hell"	4:52
2.	"No One"	3:19
3.	"Thin Legs"	2:58
4.	"Bright Soil" (featuring Wesley Schultz)	3:32
5.	"Werewolf Palm"	3:17
6.	"Sioux City"	3:10
7.	"Blue Floral"	3:57
8.	"Sun Falls"	3:20
9.	"Church Birds"	2:56
10.	"Swim Team"	3:48

==== Prairie Tremens ====
Release date: February 25, 2025

Track listing

No.	Title	Length
1.	"Good Luck"	2:19
2.	"Garden"	4:07
3.	"Tall"	2:11
4.	"God's Accent"	2:51
5.	"Prairie Tremens"	2:48
6.	"Cheetah"	3:37
7.	"Honeybee"	3:27
8.	"Wailing"	6:51
9.	"Uncle"	1:47
10.	"Clover"	3:57

=== Extended plays ===
- Ultimate Puke (April 1, 2008)
- To the Tall Trembling Trees (Jan 1, 2016)
- Wide Eyed Elk Ensemble (April 30, 2021)

=== Singles ===
Year	Song	Album
2010	"Girls With Accents"	Fences
2010	"The Same Tattoos (Sabzi Remix)"	Fences
2011	"Marketplace"	Non-album singles
2014	"Arrows" (featuring Macklemore & Ryan Lewis)	Lesser Oceans
2014	"Songs About Angels"	Lesser Oceans
2016	"Buffalo Feet"	To the Tall Trembling Trees
2021	"Globe" (with Billy Strings)	Non-album single
2026	"Sun Squint" (featuring Damien Jurado)	Now She's Long Gone Sun Squint
