= In My Bones =

2020 song by Ray Dalton

Single by Ray Dalton
- Released: January 17, 2020
- Length: 3:11
- Label: Sony Music; Epic Records Germany
- Songwriter(s): Ray Dalton; Joacim Persson; Sebastian Arman
- Producer(s): Decco

Ray Dalton singles chronology
"Bass Down" (2018)	"In My Bones" (2020)	"Good Times Hard Times" (2020)

Music video
- "In My Bones" on YouTube

"In My Bones" is a single by American singer Ray Dalton. It was released on January 17, 2020. The song was also included on Dalton's debut studio album, Thee Unknown (2024). A remix for the song was made by Malik Montana.

== Charts ==
=== Weekly charts ===
Weekly chart performance for "In My Bones"
Chart (2020)	Peak position
Belgium (Ultratop 50 Flanders)	13
Belgium (Ultratop 50 Wallonia)	44
CIS (Tophit)	715
Croatia International Airplay (Top lista)	26
Czech Republic (Rádio – Top 100)	2
Finland (Suomen virallinen lista)	71
France (SNEP)	83
Poland (Polish Airplay Top 100)	2
Slovakia (Rádio Top 100)	2

=== Year-end charts ===
Year-end chart performance for "In My Bones"
Chart (2020)	Position
Belgium (Ultratop Flanders)	48
France (SNEP)	165
Poland (ZPAV)	21

== Certifications ==
Region	Certification	Certified units/sales
Austria (IFPI Austria)	Gold	15,000^{‡}
France (SNEP)	Platinum	200,000^{‡}
Poland (ZPAV)	Platinum	50,000^{‡}
^{‡} Sales+streaming figures based on certification alone.
