= Josh Rawlings =

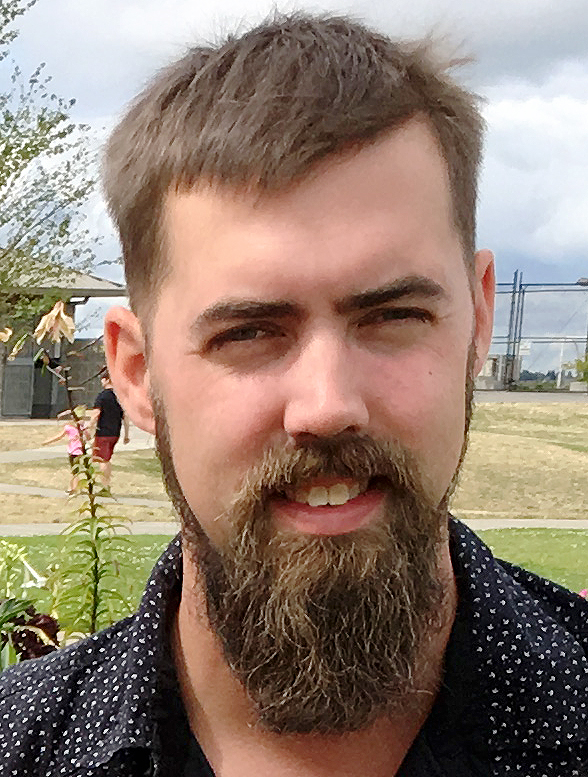
- Rawlings in 2016
- Born: Joshua Robert Rawlings; December 10, 1982 (age 43); St. Croix Falls, Wisconsin
- Occupations: musician; songwriter; record producer
- Years active: 1992–present
- Musical career
- Genres: Jazz; pop; Rock; R&B; Rap
- Instruments: Piano; keyboards; guitar; percussion; vocals
- Labels: Independent
- Website: joshrawlings.com

Joshua Robert Rawlings (born December 10, 1982, in St. Croix Falls, Wisconsin) is an American pianist, songwriter and record producer. His band, The Teaching, wrote and recorded the song "Bom Bom" for the Macklemore album The Heist, which became a multiple GRAMMY winning album.

Rawlings' work with the Seattle jazz group Industrial Revelation yielded a "Seattle Stranger Genius Award". Rawlings joined with singer Allen Stone for his 2013-14 US Tour. The Josh Rawlings Trio released their album Swell at a launch party at Bake's Place in Bellevue, Washington, in November 2016, and he had an interview about his life and career in the digital entertainment magazine WE BLAB.

== Early life ==
Rawlings was born in Saint Croix Falls, Wisconsin, to Charlene Linnae, a former chef and business owner and Todd Robert Rawlings, a patented inventor and senior quality engineer at Microsoft. Josh started playing piano at age 3, listening to the radio and figuring out songs on his mini-keyboard. His parents were both vocalists and actors in school and his father was also a percussionist. They taught Josh the fundamentals of music and rhythm and encouraged his interest in music and theater. Rawlings lived in and around the greater Twin Cities, Minnesota, through sixth grade before moving to the Seattle, Washington, area in 1997. He attended Skyline High School in Issaquah, Washington, where he composed music for the school's Alma Mater; he later attended Cornish College of the Arts in Seattle, Washington, graduating with a Bachelor of Music in Jazz Performance in 2005.

== Career ==
Rawlings has played in the Seattle area since 2001 and is a band leader for the Josh Rawlings Trio, a member of The Teaching, a member of Industrial Revelation, as well as a recording artist for Macklemore and Ryan Lewis. Rawlings was interviewed in 2017 about his career and relationship with Ryan Lewis on the Seattle Jazz Radio website, KEXP.org.

== Awards ==
- Seattle Earshot Golden Ear Award 2013
- Seattle Stranger Newspaper 2014 Genius Music Award
- Grammy Award Nomination: for his work and track "Bom Bom" on the Macklemore and Ryan Lewis album The Heist, in 2014. The Heist went on to win Best Rap Album of the year, with Macklemore and Ryan Lewis also winning Best New Artists.
- Platinum Album Award (as a contributing artist): The Macklemore album The Heist was certified platinum or better by the RIAA and has received numerous GRAMMY awards.
- Platinum Single Award: Rawlings' contributions on the song "Downtown" for the Macklemore and Ryan Lewis album This Unruly Mess I've Made was certified platinum or better by the RIAA.

== Discography ==
=== Albums ===
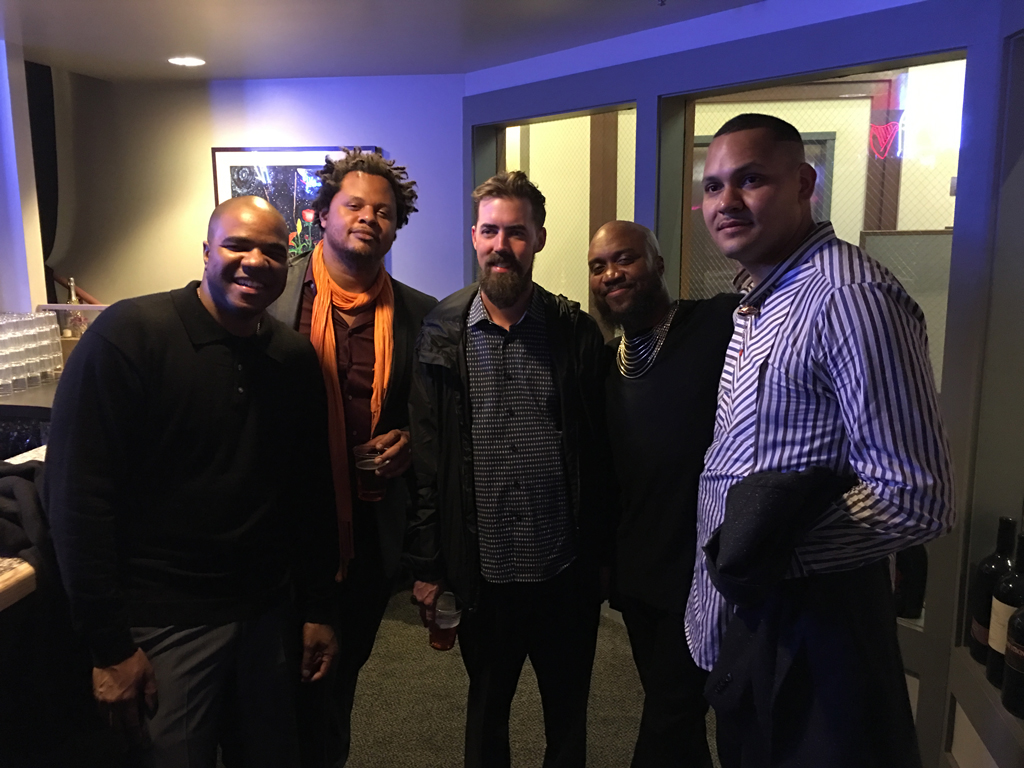
Rawlings with Industrial Revelation

- Climbing Stairs Josh Rawlings Trio (2005)
- The Teaching The Teaching (2009)
- Live at Dazzle The Teaching (2010)
- Live at the Triple Door The Teaching (2010)
- Birds in Flight The Teaching (2014)
- It Can Only Get Better From Here Industrial Revelation
- Unreal Reality Industrial Revelation
- Live at the Eastside Industrial Revelation
- Oak Head Industrial Revelation
- Live at Rhythm and Rye Industrial Revelation
- Liberation & the Kingdom of Nri Industrial Revelation
- Additional Discography at AllMusic.com

=== Singles ===
- "Marmalade" (2017) on the GEMINI album.
- "Downtown" August 27, 2015, on the This Unruly Mess I've Made album.

=== Productions ===
- Macklemore - "Bom Bom" (2012) with The Teaching on The Heist album. GEMINI album (2017).
- Macklemore and Ryan Lewis - This Unruly Mess I've Made (2016).
