= Hollis (singer) =

American singer

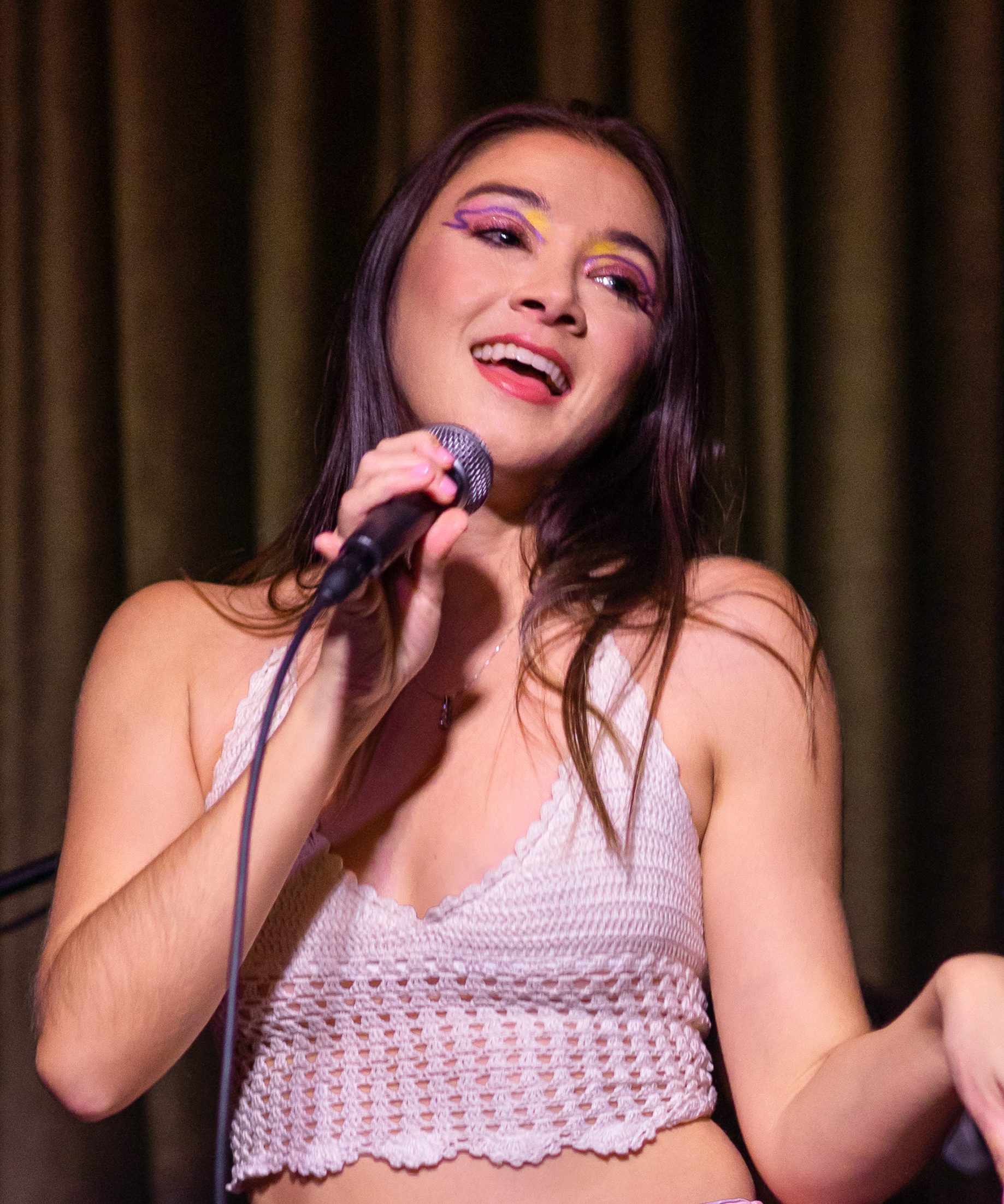
- Hollis performing in 2021

Background information
- Also known as: Hollis Wong-Wear
- Born: Hollis Audrey Wear; May 29, 1987 (age 39); Petaluma, California, U.S.
- Origin: Seattle, Washington, U.S.
- Genres: Pop; hip hop
- Occupations: Singer; songwriter
- Years active: 2013–present
- Labels: The Flavr Blue; Macklemore & Ryan Lewis
- Website: holliswongwear.com

Hollis Wong-Wear (born May 29, 1987), known mononymously as Hollis, is an American singer. She is best known for featuring on "White Walls", a song by Macklemore & Ryan Lewis, which also featured Schoolboy Q. Hollis is also a spoken-word artist.

== Career ==
Her major debut was on Macklemore & Ryan Lewis' debut album, The Heist. This was followed by the single "White Walls" in which she did the vocals for Macklemore and Ryan Lewis. This song peaked at number 15 on the Billboard Hot 100 chart.

Hollis was nominated for the 2014 Grammy Awards for songwriting and vocals on Macklemore & Ryan Lewis's album, The Heist.

Wong-Wear is the lead singer for Seattle-based R&B trio The Flavr Blue. Alongside her work with the band, Wong-Wear releases music under her first name. She released an extended play Half-Life in 2020 and released a debut record titled Subliminal in 2022, which was preceded by multiple singles. She is currently signed to AntiFragile Music.

== Discography ==
=== Albums ===
Title	Details
Subliminal	Released: May 6, 2022; Label: AntiFragile Music; Formats: LP, digital download

=== Extended plays ===
Title	Details
Half-Life	Released: February 14, 2020; Label: Self-released; Formats: LP, digital download

=== Singles ===
==== As lead artist ====
Title	Year	Album
"Sedative"	2019	Half-Life
"All My Weight"	2020	Half-Life
"Sick Sad World"	2021	Subliminal
"Grace Lee"	2021	Subliminal
"Less Like"	2021	Subliminal
"Let Me Not"	2021	Subliminal
"Tripwires"	2021	Subliminal
"Burn Burn"	2022	Subliminal

==== As featured artist ====
List of singles as featured artist, with selected chart positions and certifications, showing year released and album name
Title	Year	Peak chart positions										Certifications	Album
Title	Year	US	US R&B	US Rap	AUS	CAN	FRA	GER	NZ	SWI	UK	Certifications	Album
"White Walls" (Macklemore & Ryan Lewis featuring Schoolboy Q and Hollis)	2013	15	3	3	34	17	65	17	6	32	26	RIAA: 2× Platinum; ARIA: Gold; RMNZ: 2 Platinum	The Heist
"What I Love About You" (Don't Talk to the Cops! featuring Hollis)	2013	–	–	–	–	–	–	–	–	–	–		Non-album single
"Otter Pop" (Shawn Wasabi featuring Hollis)	2017	–	–	–	–	–	–	–	–	–	–		Non-album single
"Take Two" (Chong the Nomad featuring Hollis)	2020	–	–	–	–	–	–	–	–	–	–		Non-album single
"Seeking a Friend for the End of the World" (DANakaDAN featuring Hollis)	2021	–	–	–	–	–	–	–	–	–	–		Non-album single
"ROLLIN" (Watsky featuring Hollis & Gifted Gab)	2023	–	–	–	–	–	–	–	–	–	–		INTENTION
"—" denotes a recording that did not chart or was not released in that territory.
