= Jon Jon Augustavo =

American director

- Born: Jonathan Augustavo; Seattle, Washington
- Occupations: Filmmaker, music video director, commercial director
- Website: jonjonaug.com

Jonathan Augustavo, better known as Jon Jon or Jon Jon Augustavo, is an American filmmaker, commercial director, and music video director who has written and directed works for artists including Macklemore & Ryan Lewis, Mike Posner, Allen Stone, Vicci Martinez, Nipsey Hussle, Blue Scholars, The Physics, Sammy Adams, among others. He is of mixed Filipino and American ethnicity.

His most notable videos coming with Macklemore & Ryan Lewis with "Thrift Shop," "Can't Hold Us" and "Same Love," which have combined for over 800 million views since their release.

Jon Jon's videos for Macklemore "Thrift Shop," "Can't Hold Us," & "Same Love," were nominated for 6 2013 MTV Video Music Awards, including Video of the year, Best Hip Hop video, Best Video with a Social Message, Best Direction, Best Cinematography and Best Editing. "Same Love," took home the award for Best Video with a Social Message and "Can't Hold Us," won Best Cinematography and Best Hip Hop Video.

Jon Jon is a graduate of Art Center College of Design in Pasadena, California.

== Awards ==
Year	Video	Ceremony	Category	Result
2013	Macklemore, "Thrift Shop"	2013 MuchMusic Video Awards	International Video of the Year	Won
2013	Macklemore, "Thrift Shop"	BET Awards 2013	Video of the Year	Nominated
2013	Macklemore, "Thrift Shop"	2013 MTV Video Music Awards	Video of the Year	Nominated
2013	Macklemore, "Thrift Shop"	UK Music Video Awards	Best Urban Video - International	Nominated
2013	Macklemore, "Can't Hold Us"	2013 MTV Video Music Awards	Best Hip-Hop Video	Won
2013	Macklemore, "Can't Hold Us"	2013 MTV Video Music Awards	Best Direction	Nominated
2013	Macklemore, "Can't Hold Us"	2013 MTV Video Music Awards	Best Editing	Nominated
2013	Macklemore, "Can't Hold Us"	2013 MTV Video Music Awards	Best Cinematography	Won
2013	Macklemore, "Can't Hold Us"	56th Annual Grammy Awards	Best Music Video	Nominated
2013	Macklemore, "Can't Hold Us"	UK Music Video Awards	Best Urban Video - International	Nominated
2013	Macklemore, "Same Love"	2013 MTV Video Music Awards	Best Video with a Social Message	Won

== Notable videos ==
2016

- Afrojack & Fais "Used to Have it All"
- Milow "No No No "
- KOLAJ & Eric Nam "Into You"
- DVBBS "LA LA Land"
- Mike Posner "I Took a Pill in Ibiza (SeeB Remix)"

2015

- DJ Fresh "Believer "
- Shawn Mendes "Aftertaste"
- Shawn Mendes "Stitches"
- Shawn Mendes "Life of the Party"
- Kygo "Firestone"
- Magic! "No Way No"
- Shawn Mendes "Never Be Alone "
- Greg Holden "Hold On Tight"
- NF "Wake Up"

2014

- Shawn Mendes "Something Big"
- Schoolboy Q "Hell of a Night"
- The Head and the Heart "Let's Be Still"
- Panama Wedding "All of The People"
- Romeo Testa "I'm So Down"
- Ella Eyre "Comeback"
- SOJA "I Believe"
- Avi Buffalo "So What"
- Big Freedia "Explode"
- Kopecky Family Band "Are You Listening"
- Mary Lambert "Body Love"
- Example "Kids Again"
- Sol "Tomorrow"

2013

- Mike Posner "Top of The World feat. Big Sean"
- Romeo Testa "With You "
- MKTO "God Only Knows"
- Tori Kelly "Dear No One"
- Tinie Tempah "Children of The Sun feat. John Martin"
- Sammy Adams "LA Story feat. Mike Posner"
- Little Nikki "Little Nikki Says "
- The Midnight Beast "Bassface"
- Macklemore & Ryan Lewis "Can't Hold Us (feat. Ray Dalton)"
- Vicci Martinez "Come Along feat. Cee Lo Green"
- Allen Stone "Celebrate Tonight "
- Jarvis "Make A Little Room"
- Theo Martins "KILLER Ft. Maryann Vasquez"

2012

- Macklemore & Ryan Lewis "Same Love"
- Macklemore & Ryan Lewis "Thrift Shop"
- Nipsey Hussle "Rose Clique"
- Blue Scholars "Seijun Suzuki"
- Avatar Young Blaze "Feeding My Flame"
- Eighty4 Fly "Cool Kids"
