= Same Love =

2012 single by Macklemore & Ryan Lewis

Single by Macklemore & Ryan Lewis featuring Mary Lambert

from the album The Heist
- Released: July 18, 2012
- Recorded: February 2012
- Genre: Conscious hip hop; political hip hop
- Length: 5:20
- Label: Macklemore LLC
- Songwriters: Ben Haggerty; Ryan Lewis; Mary Lambert
- Producer: Ryan Lewis

Macklemore & Ryan Lewis singles chronology
"Wings" (2011)	"Same Love" (2012)	"Thrift Shop" (2012)

Mary Lambert singles chronology
"Same Love" (2012)	"She Keeps Me Warm" (2013)

7" vinyl issue

Music video
- "Same Love" on YouTube

"Same Love" is a song by American hip hop duo Macklemore & Ryan Lewis, released as the third single from their 2012 debut studio album, The Heist. The track, featuring vocals by Seattle-based singer Mary Lambert, talks about the issue of gay and lesbian rights and was recorded during the campaign for Washington Referendum 74, which, upon approval in November 2012, legalized same-sex marriage in Washington State. The song reached number 11 on the Billboard Hot 100 in the United States, number 1 in Australia and New Zealand, and the top 10 in Canada, Ireland, the United Kingdom. The song was nominated at the 56th Annual Grammy Awards for Song of the Year.

The cover artwork for the single shows a photograph of Macklemore's uncle, John Haggerty, and his husband, Sean.

== Composition ==
"Same Love" was unofficially adopted as an anthem by supporters of legalizing same-sex marriage, particularly in reference to Washington Referendum 74, a Washington state referendum to approve or reject the February 2012 bill that would legalize same-sex marriage in the state.

Macklemore explained that the song also came out of his own frustration with hip hop's positions on homosexuality. "Misogyny and homophobia are the two acceptable means of oppression in hip hop culture. It's 2012. There needs to be some accountability. I think that as a society we're evolving and I think that hip hop has always been a representation of what's going on in the world right now."

== Reception ==
"Same Love" received critical acclaim. Gary Nunn in The Guardian said that the song was "a far cry from the cheese-fest that usually puts commercial interest first, tenuous rhyming couplets second and poignancy last" and that it "may be the most profound song" hip-hop as a genre has produced. Critic Robert Christgau named it one of the top ten singles of 2012 and wrote that the song was "the best gay marriage song to date in any genre and as corny as it damn well oughta be."

Jody Rosen of Rolling Stone, although giving the album a mixed review, called "Same Love" one of its "virtues". David Jeffries of AllMusic described the track as a "pro-gay marriage highlight". Adam Fleischer of XXL wrote "Lewis provides bright and uplifting instrumentation to perfectly reflect Macklemore's forward-thinking analysis of hip-hop and society's take on homosexuality and same sex marriage." Billboard listed "Same Love" at number four on their list of Best Songs of 2013, stating that "the triumph of "Same Love" is in its specificity".

"Same Love" became the first Top 40 song in the U.S. to promote and celebrate same-sex marriage.

== Music video ==
The music video for "Same Love", directed by Ryan Lewis and Jon Jon Augustavo and produced by Tricia Davis, debuted on Lewis's YouTube account on October 2, 2012, and accumulated 350,000 views 24 hours after its debut. The video, spanning decades, depicts the life of the main character and the same-sex partner with whom he falls in love, including the social conflicts which befall them in relation to their sexual orientation, their eventual marriage, and the death of one of the partners in old age. The wedding of the main couple was filmed at All Pilgrims Christian Church in Seattle. Macklemore and Mary Lambert cameo in non-speaking roles in the video. The casting for the video was done by Daniel Torok.

The description of the video links to the website of Music4Marriage.org, an initiative to encourage musical support for Washington State Referendum 74; the organization dissolved after its passage.

The video received the 2013 MTV Video Music Award for Best Video with a Message.

== Live performances ==
On October 30, 2012, Macklemore, Ryan Lewis and Mary Lambert appeared on The Ellen DeGeneres Show performing the single "Same Love". It was performed live on Comedy Central's The Colbert Report on May 1, 2013. It was performed live at the 2013 MTV Video Music Awards on August 25, 2013 with Jennifer Hudson joining Macklemore, Lewis and Lambert on stage.

The song was performed during the 56th Grammy Awards where Macklemore, Lewis, and Lambert were joined onstage by Queen Latifah who oversaw and officiated the weddings of 33 same-sex and opposite-sex couples. Towards the end of the performance, Madonna joined in with a rendition of her song "Open Your Heart". The song was later performed during the 2017 National Rugby League Grand Final in Sydney, Australia. Several conservative politicians actively opposing marriage equality in Australia criticized the decision to include the song prior to the performance. Macklemore responded to the criticism by promising to "go harder".

== Chart performance ==
The single was released on July 18, 2012. It entered the Billboard Hot 100 the week of February 16, 2013 at number 99 and later peaked at number 11. On the US Rap chart, "Same Love" placed within the Top 5, peaking at number 2. This gave Macklemore and Ryan Lewis simultaneous Top 5 songs, along with "Thrift Shop" and "Can't Hold Us". "Same Love" also reached number 1 in New Zealand, number 4 on the Canadian Hot 100, and number 6 on the UK Singles Chart and in Ireland. As of September 2013, the song has sold over 2 million copies in the United States.

The song also replaced "Thrift Shop" at number 1 on the Australian ARIA Charts in January 2013, making Macklemore only the third artist to replace themselves at number one on the ARIA Charts after Madonna in 1985 and the Black Eyed Peas in 2009. The song reached the peak once again in 2017, following the legalisation of same sex marriage in Australia.

== Awards and nominations ==
Year	Ceremony	Award	Result
2013	MTV Video Music Award	Best Video with a Social Message	Won
2014	Grammy Award (56th)	Song of the Year	Nominated

== Track listing ==
Digital download / 7"

1. "Same Love" (featuring Mary Lambert) – 5:20

Same Love – Remixes

1. "Same Love" (Cutmore Club Mix; featuring Mary Lambert) – 5:52
2. "Same Love" (Cutmore Radio Edit; featuring Mary Lambert) – 3:53

== Credits and personnel ==
Credits and personnel are adapted from The Heist album liner notes.

- Macklemore – writer, mixing, recording
- Ryan Lewis – writer, producer, mixing, recording
- Mary Lambert – writer
- Josh Rawlings – piano
- Andrew Joslyn – violin
- Natalie Hall – cello
- Greg Kramer – trombone

== Charts and certifications ==
=== Weekly charts ===
Chart (2012–13)	Peak position
Australia (ARIA)	1
Austria (Ö3 Austria Top 40)	19
Belgium (Ultratop 50 Flanders)	11
Belgium (Ultratop 50 Wallonia)	13
Canada Hot 100 (Billboard)	4
Czech Republic Airplay (ČNS IFPI)	9
Denmark (Tracklisten)	38
Finland Airplay (Radiosoittolista)	92
France (SNEP)	19
Germany (GfK)	25
Ireland (IRMA)	6
Italy (FIMI)	20
Netherlands (Dutch Top 40)	13
Netherlands (Single Top 100)	18
New Zealand (Recorded Music NZ)	1
Scottish Singles Sales (Official Charts)	7
Sweden (Sverigetopplistan)	53
Switzerland (Schweizer Hitparade)	33
UK Singles (Official Charts)	6
UK Hip Hop/R&B (Official Charts)	1
UK Indie (Official Charts)	1
US Billboard Hot 100	11
US Hot R&B/Hip-Hop Songs (Billboard)	3
US Pop Airplay (Billboard)	5
US Rhythmic Airplay (Billboard)	3
US Rock & Alternative Airplay (Billboard)	23

=== Year-end charts ===
Chart (2013)	Position
Australia (ARIA)	14
Belgium (Ultratop 50 Flanders)	84
Belgium (Ultratop Flanders Urban)	20
Belgium (Ultratop 50 Wallonia)	100
Canada (Canadian Hot 100)	31
France (SNEP)	77
Netherlands (Dutch Top 40)	65
Netherlands (Single Top 100)	69
New Zealand (Recorded Music NZ)	15
Sweden (Sverigetopplistan)	100
UK Singles (OCC)	70
US Billboard Hot 100	43
US Hot R&B/Hip-Hop Songs (Billboard)	13
US Mainstream Top 40 (Billboard)	33
US Rhythmic (Billboard)	21
US Rap Songs (Billboard)	9

== Certifications ==
Region	Certification	Certified units/sales
Australia (ARIA)	6× Platinum	420,000^{‡}
Canada (Music Canada)	Platinum	80,000^{*}
Italy (FIMI)	Gold	15,000^{‡}
New Zealand (RMNZ)	3× Platinum	45,000^{*}
United Kingdom (BPI)	Platinum	600,000^{‡}
United States (RIAA)	4× Platinum	4,000,000^{‡}
^{*} Sales figures based on certification alone.^{‡} Sales+streaming figures based on certification alone.

== "She Keeps Me Warm" ==
"She Keeps Me Warm"

Single by Mary Lambert

from the album Welcome to the Age of My Body
- Released: July 30, 2013
- Genre: Pop; R&B
- Length: 3:51
- Label: Self-released
- Songwriter: Mary Lambert

Mary Lambert singles chronology
"Same Love" (2012)	"She Keeps Me Warm" (2013)	"Secrets" (2014)

"She Keeps Me Warm" is a song written and performed by Mary Lambert, derived from the chorus she provided to "Same Love". It is included on Lambert's debut major-label EP, Welcome to the Age of My Body (2013), and was released to American hot adult contemporary radio in the summer of 2013 as her first solo single.

=== Background and content ===
"She Keeps Me Warm" (and the chorus it shares with "Same Love") was inspired by Lambert's experiences with love and growing up homosexual in a religious family. Lambert explained to Entertainment Tonight at the 56th Grammy Awards that the song came about as a result of her wanting to write a song that was "genuine and authentic to [her] experience". While written from the particular perspective of a lesbian, the song's themes of love and security in relationships have a universal appeal, which contributed to its warm reception on pop radio. Chad Rufer, PD of KZZO Sacramento, suggested to Billboard that the original version "has more of a political stance than Lambert's" and that the re-worked "She Keeps Me Warm" is "simply a great pop song about falling in love."

=== Music video ===
The music video for "She Keeps Me Warm" was directed by Mego Lin and premiered on VEVO on August 24, 2013. It features Bryn Santillan. An official lyric video was released December 17, 2013 in support of the song's parent EP.

=== Chart performance ===
"She Keeps Me Warm" debuted at number 38 on the Billboard Adult Top 40 chart for the week ending January 25, 2014.

Chart (2014)	Peak position
US Adult Pop Airplay (Billboard)	20
