= Capturx =

Mobile software platform

Capturx is a no-code mobile software platform for use with digital pens or any modern touch screen device, designed for organizations to automate paper-based data collection and similar operations. Paper survives because it is easy and reliable- but paper-based workflows include manual labor like scanning and data entry. Data on paper frequently languishes in the field, waiting to get delivered, scanned, re-typed, or is subject to misinterpretation during transcription.

The challenge Capturx attempts to tackle is process reengineering of paper based processes. Capturx works as an add-in with Microsoft Office Excel, and SharePoint, passing structured handwritten paper forms or data captured with touch screen devices into a SharePoint database and further integrated into corporate databases.

The add-in software works with digital pens from Anoto. The pattern is like a digital fingerprint making each printed page unique to each application and file, as the pen writes it stores the handwriting digitally for integration into the native application of the paper document.

The software and digital pens are typically used for field service, data collection, note taking, compliance, and red line markups of building plans.

== Maker of Capturx Software ==
Capturx commercial products are produced by Field Data Integrators LLC (FDI) (formerly Adapx, Inc.), a natural user interface software company. FDI is a continuation of the Adapx, Inc. effort, which was started in 1999. FDI is based in Olympia, WA.
