= Wings (Macklemore & Ryan Lewis song) =

Single by Macklemore & Ryan Lewis

from the album The Heist
- Released: January 21, 2011
- Recorded: 2009–10
- Genre: Alternative hip hop
- Length: 5:00
- Label: Macklemore LLC
- Songwriters: Ben Haggerty; Ryan Lewis; Hollis Wong-Wear
- Producer: Ryan Lewis

Macklemore & Ryan Lewis singles chronology
"Wings" (2011)	"Same Love" (2012)

Music video
- "Wings" on YouTube

"Wings" (stylized as "Wing$") is a song by American hip hop duo Macklemore & Ryan Lewis, released as the debut single from their first studio album The Heist. It features uncredited vocals from children.

== Context ==
Macklemore explained the subject of the single as follows:

The song "Wings" is about the pursuit of identity through the means of consumerism. The attempt is to dissect our infatuation and attachment to logos, labels, brands and the fleeting happiness that is intrinsically linked to the almighty power of the purchase. The subject I use in the song is shoes, but its aim is to paint a broader picture of being a consumer and tracing the lineage back to my first memory of retail infused desire.

== Music video ==
The music video, directed by Zia Mohajerjasbi, alludes to an autobiographical story line. It depicts its main character (Macklemore) and his experiences as a young boy infatuated with basketball and basketball paraphernalia, athletic shoes in particular, and what adverse effect it had on him as he grew up.

The music video starts with Macklemore now a grown-up man, going into an empty basketball court, where the indications are, that he apparently used to practice basketball himself. Macklemore raps while he reminisces himself as a small kid wearing a Chicago Bulls jersey number 23 (clearly alluding to NBA player Michael Jordan) and wearing, in a close-up, Nike sneakers that would "make him fly" (another reference to Nike Air Jordan sneakers). He describes "touching the net" as being the "best day of my life" (also a sample of a Jordan typical Nike ad), boasting about his skills to his mother and friends... until that is "my friend Carlos' brother got murdered for his fours, whoa", a reference to the basketball shoes he was wearing. This incident becomes a wake-up call to young Macklemore.

Then the music video shows kids and youth practicing because they wish "to fly".

The following scenes display a grown-up man (Macklemore) instructing youth in an apparent awareness campaign meeting them in a hair salon or while traveling on a bus, talking to them through an open book what he thinks is essential and what is secondary, warning them of the consequences of consumerism, particularly regarding basketball sneakers.

The music video then shows a flashback of the young kid back in school wearing Seattle SuperSonics apparel. On his way back home all alone, he is followed by three juveniles eyeing him. Then there is a scene where the kid has been roughed up with his backpack and sneakers stolen as he walks home only with his socks on. Reaching home, he can barely take off his socks to wear a new clean pair. The choosing of the Sonics jersey is poignant to add further autobiographical aspect to the music video again showing that it is about Macklemore's own experiences and about a friend that he knew.

Then there is a camera cut back to other young boys and girls in "Niketown" in front of a catchy Nike display saying "JUST DO IT”, along with other people with Nike shoes. Then back a final flashback at the young kid wearing a Nike pair dreaming of his first day in school.

The final shot is back to the original scene at the basketball court with Macklemore still rapping as a grown and much wiser man.

The music video is full of basketball memorabilia including promotional snapshots of Michael Jordan, many posters of Jordan with wide openly stretched arms, and a #23 jersey, a picture Macklemore replicates himself on cover of the release, with him wearing the #23 Chicago Bulls jersey with a snapshot with exactly the same pose as that of Jordan.

Despite the whole music video being a warning of consumerism, especially with Nikes, Macklemore is wearing Nikes himself throughout the music video.

== "Wings" (NBA All-Star Weekend Edition) (2013) ==
An alternative version of this song was used for commercials involving the 2013 NBA All-Star Game. It was heavily used in TNT television channel's promotion to the event and at the event itself. The promotional film with Macklemore wearing the West #3 Chris Paul (eventual MVP of the All Star Game) red jersey, is shown in a new video accompanied by a young choir wearing All Star T-shirts. Macklemore showed up the day of the shooting of the video in a middle school gym in Los Angeles where he says that he was informed that they might:

re-arrange the structure of the song to fit the NBA event. He added that in any licensing deal, they are going to edit anyway. A "4-minute song does not fit into a 30-second movie trailer. Lyrics have to get cut in order for the trailer/ad to make sense with what the company is promoting"

Macklemore was criticized for agreeing to this heavily edited new version in which almost all negative references to Nike were edited out, or taken out of context, with the resulting video becoming a promotional piece for the NBA.

Macklemore responded in a lengthy message to the criticism levelled against him of "selling out". In a very candid piece entitled "Wing$, the NBA All-Star Game, & Selling Out" dated 21 February 2013, and signed by Macklemore himself and published on his official website, Macklemore addressed many of the concerns of the critics. He says:

The All Star game intro was seen by millions of people on Sunday who had no idea who we were. My thinking was, if they liked the song they will go and listen to the full version. Those who hear the original song in its entirety will get the core of what gives the song depth. Some might even buy it and become real fans. And guess what version they get? Not the TNT chopped up edit, but the full one.
In my stripped down definition, selling out is compromising your artistic integrity for money/fame. In my heart I can tell you that my personal artistic integrity remained completely intact over the weekend. TNT used our song. They’re still my words. They picked the parts that fit their ad campaign, and visually matched it to us performing, threw in a highlight reel of crazy dunks and had a bunch of kids singing the hook in a gym. Word. I’m all for that. If you take away the consumerism cautionary core of Wings, a story still remains. And that story is one that I'm still proud of, and it’s dope to me that it’s relatable enough for TNT to want to use it.

== Charts ==
=== Weekly charts ===
Chart (2013)	Peak position
Australia (ARIA)	17
France (SNEP)	155
US Bubbling Under Hot 100 (Billboard)	12
US Hot R&B/Hip-Hop Songs (Billboard)	40

== Certifications ==
Region	Certification	Certified units/sales
Australia (ARIA)	Platinum	70,000^{^}
New Zealand (RMNZ)	Platinum	30,000^{‡}
United Kingdom (BPI)	Silver	200,000^{‡}
United States (RIAA)	Platinum	1,000,000^{‡}
^{^} Shipments figures based on certification alone.^{‡} Sales+streaming figures based on certification alone.

== Release history ==
Region	Date	Format	Label
United States	January 21, 2011	Digital download	Macklemore
United Kingdom	July 20, 2011	Digital download	Macklemore
