= Thrift Shop =

Single by Macklemore & Ryan Lewis featuring Wanz

from the album The Heist
- B-side: "Ten Thousand Hours"
- Released: August 27, 2012
- Recorded: 2011
- Genre: Pop-rap; comedy hip hop
- Length: 3:55
- Label: Macklemore LLC
- Songwriters: Ben Haggerty; Ryan Lewis
- Producer: Lewis

Macklemore & Ryan Lewis singles chronology
| "Same Love" (2012) | "Thrift Shop" (2012) | "Can't Hold Us" (2013) |

Wanz singles chronology
| "Thrift Shop" (2012) | "Family" (2012) |

Music video
- "Thrift Shop" on YouTube

"Thrift Shop" is a song written and performed by American hip hop duo Macklemore & Ryan Lewis. It was released in 2012 as the fourth single from the pair's debut studio album The Heist (2012), and features vocals from American singer Wanz. The lyrics tell of Macklemore's esteem for going to thrift shops and saving money, rather than flaunting expensive items like many rappers. The song was met with universal acclaim, with various music reviewers praising its humorous lyrics and social critique.

Despite being released on Macklemore's independent record label with distribution by the Alternative Distribution Alliance (ADA), a Warner Music Group company, the single was a sleeper hit. It reached number one on the US Billboard Hot 100 and has since sold over 6 million copies in the US alone. The song also reached number one in the United Kingdom, Ireland, Canada, France, Denmark, Netherlands, Australia and New Zealand. The song would go on to become the number one song of 2013 by Billboard and in 2019, it was named by Billboard as the number one song of the 2010s on both the Hot Rap Songs and the Hot R&B/Hip-Hop Songs charts.

A music video was released simultaneously with the song on August 29, 2012, and has more than 1.9 billion views on YouTube as of February 2025. At the 56th Annual Grammy Awards in 2014, the single won for Best Rap Performance and Best Rap Song.

== Background and composition ==
The song illustrates Macklemore's interest in buying cheap clothing from thrift shops, disdaining designer labels and trends. He claims to enjoy donning "your granddad's clothes" and impulsively buying a sharp-looking but strong-smelling fur stole just because "it was 99 cents". Macklemore spoke to MTV News about the meaning of the song. "Rappers talk about, oh I buy this and I buy that, and I spend this much money and I make it rain, and this type of champagne and painting the club, and this is the kind of record that's the exact opposite," he explained. "It's the polar opposite of it. It's kind of standing for like let's save some money, let's keep some money away, let's spend as little as possible and look as fresh as possible at the same time."

Asked why he thought the track was so successful, Macklemore replied, "I think hip-hop goes in waves, and it's something that's different. It's a concept. It's obviously against the status quo of what people normally rap about. This is a song that goes against all of that. How much can you save? How fresh can you look by not looking like anybody else? And on top of that, you have an infectious beat and a hook that gets stuck in people's heads."

Macklemore stated that the message he was trying to send with that song was: "Don't be a fuckboy and think that a logo is going to make you cool. There are finds out there. There are treasures. There are amazing ways that you can freak fashion and be an individual, and we don't need to get caught up spending all this money. Save it. Go to the thrift shop."

"Thrift Shop" is written in the key of G♯ minor and has a tempo of 95 beats per minute. The song is prominently underpinned by a looping saxophone melody.

== Critical reception ==
Professional ratings
Review scores
| Source | Rating |
|---|---|
| Digital Spy | 5/5 stars |

The song received widespread critical acclaim. It has been called a critique of the product placement common in modern hip hop, but The New York Times critic Jon Caramanica wrote, "[I]t's not quite the robust sendup of hip-hop-extravagance clichés that it aspires to be." Robert Copsey of Digital Spy gave the song 5 out of 5 stars, calling it "a rare beast of a song – original, musically daring and genuinely funny." Entertainment Weekly named the song as the 18th best single of 2012. The song was number 1 in the Triple J Hottest 100 countdown of 2012. In 2022, American Songwriter named it Macklemore's best song.

== Chart performance ==
In the United States, the song debuted on the Billboard Hot 100 on September 15, 2012. It dropped out the following week but re-entered five weeks later on October 20. The song then steadily climbed the chart until it entered the top ten in the issue dated January 5, 2013. It replaced Bruno Mars' "Locked Out of Heaven" at number one in its 16th week on the chart on February 2, 2013 and remained atop the chart for six non-consecutive weeks. It also topped the Rap Songs chart for fifteen weeks. "Thrift Shop" was the second best-selling single of 2013 in the US after Robin Thicke's "Blurred Lines", with 6,148,000 copies sold during the year. As of November 2015, the song has sold 7,740,000 downloads in the United States, making it the fifth-best selling digital single in the country ever.

The song also had much success on Billboard's component charts, remaining atop the Digital Songs chart for ten weeks and topping Billboard's Radio Songs chart for two weeks. It also peaked at number one on the On-Demand Songs chart and remained there for eleven weeks until the week ending March 30, 2013. It set a record on that chart as the first song to reach two million streams in a single week since the chart's inception. The song also topped the R&B/Hip-Hop Songs chart for fourteen consecutive weeks. The song was the first independently distributed title to top the Billboard Digital Songs since "We Are the World 25 for Haiti" in February 2010. It was also only the second independent song to reach number one on the Billboard Hot 100 chart, nearly 20 years after Lisa Loeb's "Stay (I Missed You)" in 1994. Billboard ranked it as the No. 1 song for 2013.

In the United Kingdom, "Thrift Shop" entered the UK Singles Chart at number twenty-four in late January 2013, despite having been available as a single via iTunes since August 1, 2012. The following week, the single rose twenty-two positions to number two. Two weeks after entering the chart, the song reached number one on February 10, 2013 ― for the week ending date February 16, 2013 ― making Macklemore and Ryan Lewis only the second act to have a number one in Britain with a self-released single. As of July 2013, "Thrift Shop" has sold 680,000 copies in the UK.

In Canada, the song topped the Canadian Hot 100 for six consecutive weeks. It was the country's second best-selling digital song of 2013 with 554,000 copies sold (all versions combined).

=== Wider reception ===
In August 2013, the rapper Le1f publicly criticized Macklemore's song on Twitter, claiming that "Thrift Shop" borrowed its beat extensively from his own earlier song, "Wut".

Some thrift shops have reported an increase in business, especially among college students, which they have attributed to the song. Several locations that were used in the music video and those that are located in the general vicinity of the places used for filming reported that their sales had not seen a sizable bump, but there was "attention."

== Music video ==
The accompanying music video was co-directed by Jon Jon Augustavo, Macklemore and Ryan Lewis. It was released on Lewis' YouTube channel on August 29, 2012. Filming took place at several thrift shops in Seattle, including Goodwill Outlet, Value Village in Capitol Hill, Red Light Vintage and Fremont Vintage Mall, as well as at Seattle locations like the Unicorn/Narwhal Arcade Bar and the Northwest African American Museum. Macklemore attempted to persuade a fellow Seattle rapper, Sir Mix-a-Lot, to appear in the video but he did not return the calls. Some local Seattle musicians like Thomas Grey of Champagne Champagne appear in the music video, and a DeLorean is shown as well. The video was nominated at the 2013 MTV Video Music Awards for Video of the Year.

== In popular culture ==
Postmodern Jukebox covered the song in 2013, with Robyn Adele Anderson singing in a Roaring Twenties jazz style. The video went viral and boosted the career of Postmodern Jukebox. The video gathered four million views in its first year.

=== Parodies ===
The children's show Sesame Street makes a parody of "Thrift Shop" in which Macklemore appeared playing the character "Mucklemore", shows Oscar the Grouch and his other Grouches the proper way to recycle their trash.

In 2013, KIDZ BOP covered the song as part of their 24th album. The cover changes many of the original lyrics in order to make it appropriate for children to listen to.

A parody was part of a Pessach Shop Passover Jam, done for the Jewish holiday of Passover by the a cappella group Six13.

The American comedy artist Rucka Rucka Ali parodied the song twice in his album Black Man of Steal. One of his parodies is titled "I'm Obama", the other, "I'm Osama".

Verizon Wireless parodied the song in a 2016 holiday promotion, this time in a laundromat.

American parody web show "The Hillywood Show" samples the music in its parody of British TV show Sherlock, as well as reenacting some scenes from the music video.

=== Media ===
The song was also used in the trailers for the films Pain & Gain, The Internship and Tammy.

"Weird Al" Yankovic recorded a cover version of "Thrift Shop" as part of his polka medley "NOW That's What I Call Polka!" for his 2014 album Mandatory Fun.

In 2018, a slightly modified version of the original song was also used for Suncorp advertisements featuring their mascot, Sunny.

A censored version of the song is featured in the video game Just Dance 2026 Edition. The map is fittingly set in a thrift store with the coach being a character named Dr. Vintz, who bears a resemblance to Macklemore from the original music video.

== Formats and track listings ==
Digital download
| No. | Title | Length |
|---|---|---|
| 1. | "Thrift Shop" | 3:55 |

CD
| No. | Title | Length |
|---|---|---|
| 1. | "Thrift Shop" | 3:55 |
| 2. | "Ten Thousand Hours" | 4:10 |

== Credits and personnel ==
- Ryan Lewis – production
- Macklemore – vocals, writing
- DV One – scratches
- Brooklyn Grinnell – vocals
- Wanz – vocals
- (C) 2012 Macklemore LLC
- ALL RIGHTS RESERVED

== Charts ==
=== Weekly charts ===
Weekly chart performance for "Thrift Shop"
| Chart (2012–2013) | Peak position |
|---|---|
| Australia (ARIA) | 1 |
| Austria (Ö3 Austria Top 40) | 2 |
| Belgium (Ultratop 50 Flanders) | 1 |
| Belgium (Ultratop Flanders Urban) | 1 |
| Belgium (Ultratop 50 Wallonia) | 1 |
| Brazil (ABPD) | 1 |
| Brazil (Billboard Brasil Hot 100) | 57 |
| Brazil Hot Pop Songs | 16 |
| Canada Hot 100 (Billboard) | 1 |
| Czech Republic Airplay (ČNS IFPI) | 4 |
| Denmark (Tracklisten) | 1 |
| Euro Digital Song Sales (Billboard) | 1 |
| Finland (Suomen virallinen lista) | 1 |
| France (SNEP) | 1 |
| Germany (GfK) | 2 |
| Greece (IFPI) | 1 |
| Greece Digital Songs (Billboard) | 5 |
| Hungary (Dance Top 40) | 4 |
| Hungary (Rádiós Top 40) | 9 |
| Iceland (Tonlist) | 12 |
| Ireland (IRMA) | 1 |
| Israel International Airplay (Media Forest) | 1 |
| Italy (FIMI) | 2 |
| Lebanon (The Official Lebanese Top 20) | 1 |
| Mexico Anglo (Monitor Latino) | 16 |
| Netherlands (Dutch Top 40) | 1 |
| Netherlands (Single Top 100) | 1 |
| New Zealand (Recorded Music NZ) | 1 |
| Norway (VG-lista) | 1 |
| Poland Dance (ZPAV) | 14 |
| Romania (Airplay 100) | 1 |
| Russia Airplay (TopHit) | 7 |
| Scottish Singles Sales (Official Charts) | 1 |
| Slovakia Airplay (ČNS IFPI) | 8 |
| Spain (Promusicae) | 12 |
| Sweden (Sverigetopplistan) | 2 |
| Switzerland (Schweizer Hitparade) | 1 |
| UK Singles (Official Charts) | 1 |
| UK Hip Hop/R&B (Official Charts) | 1 |
| UK Indie (Official Charts) | 1 |
| US Billboard Hot 100 | 1 |
| US Adult Pop Airplay (Billboard) | 35 |
| US Dance Club Songs (Billboard) | 27 |
| US Hot R&B/Hip-Hop Songs (Billboard) | 1 |
| US Hot Rap Songs (Billboard) | 1 |
| US Pop Airplay (Billboard) | 1 |
| US Rhythmic Airplay (Billboard) | 1 |
| US Rock & Alternative Airplay (Billboard) | 13 |
| Venezuela Pop/Rock General (Record Report) | 4 |

=== Year-end charts ===
Annual chart rankings for "Thrift Shop"
| Chart (2012) | Position |
|---|---|
| Australia (ARIA) | 9 |
| New Zealand (Recorded Music NZ) | 10 |

| Chart (2013) | Position |
|---|---|
| Australia (ARIA) | 16 |
| Austria (Ö3 Austria Top 40) | 12 |
| Belgium (Ultratop 50 Flanders) | 6 |
| Belgium (Ultratop 50 Wallonia) | 5 |
| Brazil (Crowley) | 91 |
| Canada (Canadian Hot 100) | 2 |
| France (SNEP) | 4 |
| Germany (Official German Charts) | 7 |
| Hungary (Dance Top 40) | 10 |
| Hungary (Rádiós Top 40) | 55 |
| Italy (FIMI) | 12 |
| Netherlands (Dutch Top 40) | 10 |
| Netherlands (Single Top 100) | 17 |
| New Zealand (Recorded Music NZ) | 18 |
| Russia Airplay (TopHit) | 30 |
| Spain (PROMUSICAE) | 31 |
| Sweden (Sverigetopplistan) | 3 |
| Switzerland (Schweizer Hitparade) | 5 |
| UK Singles (Official Charts Company) | 7 |
| US Billboard Hot 100 | 1 |
| US Alternative Songs (Billboard) | 42 |
| US Hot R&B/Hip-Hop Songs (Billboard) | 1 |
| US Hot Rap Songs (Billboard) | 1 |
| US Mainstream Top 40 (Billboard) | 9 |
| US Rhythmic (Billboard) | 3 |

| Chart (2014) | Position |
|---|---|
| Belgium Urban (Ultratop) | 36 |
| Hungary (Dance Top 40) | 78 |

| Chart (2024) | Position |
|---|---|
| Hungary (Rádiós Top 40) | 88 |

=== Decade-end charts ===
2010s chart rankings for "Thrift Shop"
| Chart (2010–19) | Position |
|---|---|
| Australia (ARIA) | 16 |
| US Billboard Hot 100 | 27 |
| US Hot R&B/Hip-Hop Songs (Billboard) | 1 |
| US Rap Songs (Billboard) | 1 |

=== All-time charts ===
All-time chart rankings
| Chart (1958–2018) | Position |
|---|---|
| US Billboard Hot 100 | 108 |

== Certifications ==
| Region | Certification | Certified units/sales |
|---|---|---|
| Australia (ARIA) | 11× Platinum | 770,000^{‡} |
| Austria (IFPI Austria) | Platinum | 30,000^{*} |
| Belgium (BRMA) | Gold | 15,000^{*} |
| Canada (Music Canada) | Diamond | 800,000^{‡} |
| Denmark (IFPI Danmark) | Platinum | 30,000^{^} |
| France (SNEP) | Platinum | 150,000^{*} |
| Germany (BVMI) | 3× Gold | 450,000^{^} |
| Italy (FIMI) | 2× Platinum | 60,000^{*} |
| Mexico (AMPROFON) | Platinum+Gold | 90,000^{*} |
| Netherlands (NVPI) | 2× Platinum | 40,000^{‡} |
| New Zealand (RMNZ) | 6× Platinum | 90,000^{*} |
| Norway (IFPI Norway) | 12× Platinum | 120,000^{*} |
| Spain (Promusicae) | Platinum | 60,000^{‡} |
| Sweden (GLF) | 4× Platinum | 160,000^{‡} |
| Switzerland (IFPI Switzerland) | Platinum | 30,000^{^} |
| United Kingdom (BPI) | 3× Platinum | 1,800,000 |
| United States (RIAA) | Diamond | 10,000,000^{‡} |
Streaming
| Denmark (IFPI Danmark) | 5× Platinum | 9,000,000^{†} |
| Spain (Promusicae) | Platinum | 8,000,000^{†} |
^{*} Sales figures based on certification alone.^{^} Shipments figures based on certification alone.^{‡} Sales+streaming figures based on certification alone.^{†} Streaming-only figures based on certification alone.

== See also ==
- List of Airplay 100 number ones of the 2010s
- List of best-selling singles
- List of best-selling singles in Australia
- List of best-selling singles in the United States
- List of Hot 100 number-one singles of the 2010s (U.S.)
