= Macklemore & Ryan Lewis =

American hip hop duo

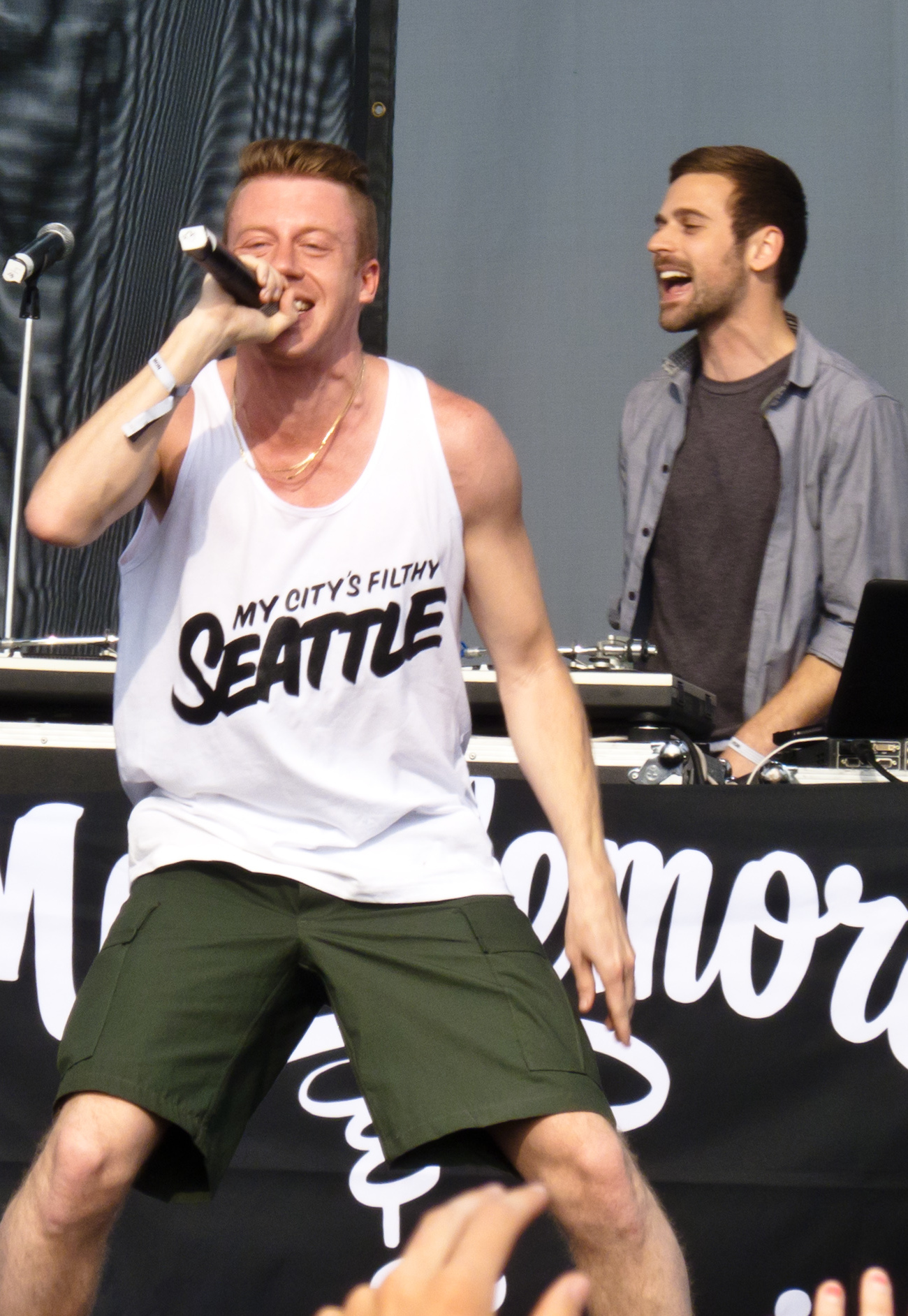
- Macklemore & Ryan Lewis at Sasquatch! Music Festival 2011

Background information
- Origin: Seattle, Washington, U.S.
- Genres: West Coast hip-hop; alternative hip-hop; pop rap
- Years active: 2009–2016
- Labels: Macklemore LLC; ADA
- Past members: Macklemore; Ryan Lewis
- Website: macklemore.com

Macklemore & Ryan Lewis were an American hip-hop duo formed 2009 in Seattle, Washington, by rapper Macklemore and record producer Ryan Lewis. That same year they released their first collaborative effort, an EP titled VS. EP. They later followed up with VS. Redux (2010), the Grammy Award-winning album The Heist (2012) and This Unruly Mess I've Made (2016).

Macklemore and Lewis' single "Thrift Shop" reached number one on the US Billboard Hot 100 in 2013. The single was soon dubbed the first song since 1994 to top the Hot 100 chart without the support of a major record label by Billboard, although Macklemore, in a slightly unusual recording contract, pays a nominal percentage of sales to use Warner Bros. Records' radio promotion department to push his singles. Their second single, "Can't Hold Us", also peaked at number one on the Hot 100 Chart, making Macklemore and Lewis the first duo in the chart's history to have their first two singles both reach the peak position. Macklemore and Lewis released their debut studio album, The Heist, on October 9, 2012, which charted at number 2 on the US Billboard 200. The pair won four Grammy Awards at the 2014 ceremony, including Best New Artist, Best Rap Album (The Heist), Best Rap Song, and Best Rap Performance ("Thrift Shop").

The duo's second album, This Unruly Mess I've Made, was released on February 26, 2016. On June 15, 2017, Macklemore announced that the duo were on an indefinite hiatus. Lewis has since collaborated on several Macklemore solo tracks.

== Career ==
=== 2006–2010: Career beginnings and The VS. ===
Macklemore and Ryan Lewis met in 2006, when Lewis worked on Macklemore's promotion as a photographer, and they soon became good friends. Lewis produced Macklemore's mixtape The Unplanned, in 2008. They performed together for the first time at Bumbershoot, at the Sasquatch Music Festival in The Gorge Amphitheatre and at the Outside Lands Music Festival in San Francisco. In 2009 they formalized the duo as Macklemore & Ryan Lewis and released the debut extended play, The VS. EP. The latter reached No. 7 on the iTunes Hip Hop chart. They also released "Irish Celebration" in December 2009 in anticipation of the release of The VS. EP. In March 2010, the duo released a free download, "Stay At Home Dad", a track that did not quite make VS. In October 2010, they released the VS. Redux EP. Macklemore and Lewis used his experience with substance abuse as the inspiration for the mixtape's critically acclaimed song "Otherside", which samples the Red Hot Chili Peppers song of the same title.

=== 2011–2014: Breakthrough with The Heist ===
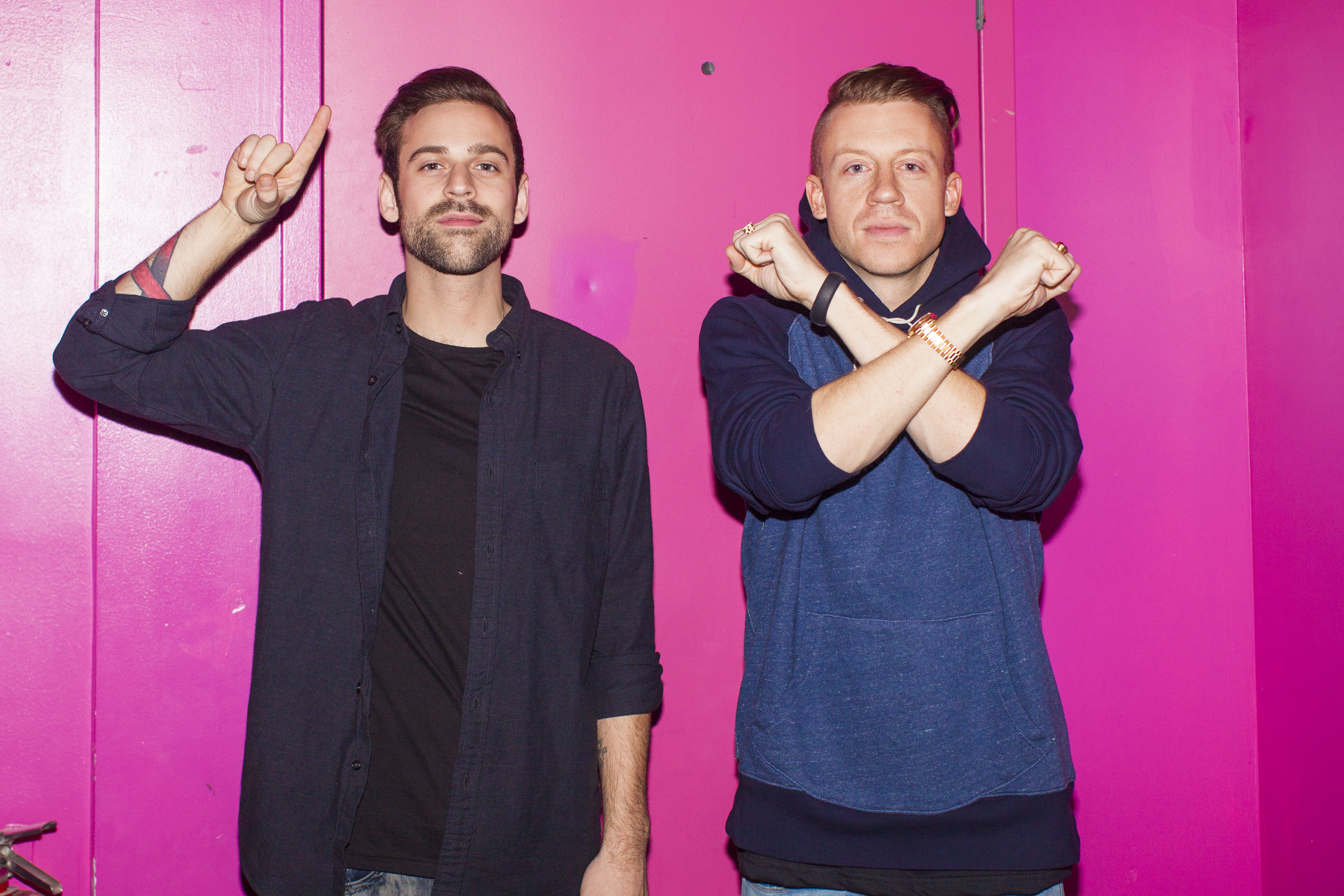
Macklemore and Ryan Lewis at the Xbox One launch at the Best Buy Theater in Times Square, New York City, in November 2013.

In 2011, they released the single "My Oh My" as a tribute to deceased Seattle Mariners broadcaster Dave Niehaus, which received extensive coverage in Seattle media. On April 8, 2011, they performed the song at the 2011 Mariners Opening Day to a sold-out crowd of nearly 48,000 attendees. "Wings" was released on January 21, 2011, and charted on Billboard's Bubbling Under Hot 100 Singles at number 12, and was followed by "Can't Hold Us" featuring Ray Dalton on August 16, 2011. "Can't Hold Us" eventually became the duo's second number 1 on the Billboard Hot 100 on May 18, 2013, and stayed there for 5 weeks. In February 2011, they kicked off a multi-city tour in Pullman, Washington, which included three sold-out shows at Showbox at the Market, a Seattle music venue. That same year, the rapper appeared at several U.S. music festivals including Bumbershoot, Outside Lands, Lollapalooza, Rock the Bells, SoundSet, Sasquatch, and Bonnaroo. Their album The Heist was released in October 2012. Previously released singles "My Oh My", "Wings", and "Can't Hold Us" were announced to be included on the album – as was the song "Make the Money". "Can't Hold Us" was used as the soundtrack for a Miller beer ad in the UK and Ireland in June 2012, increasing Macklemore and Ryan Lewis's recognition in Europe.

"Same Love" was released on July 18, 2012, and later peaked at number 11 on the Billboard Hot 100. The songs "White Walls" featuring ScHoolboy Q and "Jimmy Iovine" featuring Ab-Soul were confirmed to be included on the album. "Thrift Shop" was released on August 27, 2012, and charted at number 1 on 24 charts worldwide, including topping the Billboard Hot 100 for six weeks, giving them their first number 1 hit in the US. The Heist debuted on the US Billboard 200 at number 2 of the week dated October 27, 2012, selling over 78,000 copies. On October 30, 2012, Macklemore and Lewis appeared on The Ellen DeGeneres Show performing their single "Same Love" and then again on January 18, 2013, performing their single "Thrift Shop", which they had sung previously on Late Night with Jimmy Fallon on December 11, 2012. "The Heist World Tour" began in August 2012 to promote The Heist. On October 8, 2013, they released their fifth and final single from The Heist, "White Walls", which charted at number 15 on the Billboard Hot 100. On January 26, 2014, they performed "Same Love" at the 56th Annual Grammy Awards, where Queen Latifah read marriage vows for 33 couples who lined the aisles. "This is a love song, not for some of us but for all of us," she said, followed by an appearance from Madonna singing "Open Your Heart".

=== 2015–2017: This Unruly Mess I've Made and hiatus ===
In January 2015, Macklemore announced via Twitter that the duo's second studio album would be released sometime in the second half of the year. On August 5, 2015, Macklemore released a song as a free download, titled "Growing Up (Sloane's Song)", which featured Ed Sheeran. On August 27, 2015, the duo released "Downtown", the first single of their second studio album, which they performed at the 2015 MTV Video Music Awards on August 30. It charted at number 12 on the Billboard Hot 100. On November 22, 2015, Macklemore and Ryan Lewis debuted the song "Kevin" at the American Music Awards with Leon Bridges. On January 22, 2016, the duo released "White Privilege II", the second promotional single on This Unruly Mess I've Made. "Spoons" was released as the third promotional single on February 14, 2016 but did not appear as an official track upon the album's release. "Buckshot" & "Kevin" were released as the fourth and fifth promotional singles on February 23, 2016. "Dance Off" was released as the second single from the album on February 25, 2016. Their new album, This Unruly Mess I've Made, was released on February 26, 2016. It charted at number 4 on the Billboard 200.

On June 15, 2017, Macklemore announced via his official Instagram that the duo were on hiatus. In 2021, Lewis helped produced the new Macklemore solo single "Next Year". He also wrote or helped produce two tracks on the 2023 Macklemore album Ben, including the single "Maniac".

== Public image ==
The duo was in the Unsigned Hype in The Source in early 2012 and was also on the cover of XXL magazine as part of the Freshman Class of 2012. Rolling Stone called Macklemore and Ryan Lewis an "indie rags-to-riches story". "Thrift Shop" was voted No. 1 in Australian radio station Triple J's Hottest 100 of 2012. Their song "Same Love" also featured highly, coming in at No. 15 in the countdown. The Hottest 100 is the world's largest music poll held every year on the last Saturday of January, and currently attracts over one million votes from within Australia and around the world. There was a three-page article on Macklemore and Lewis's career in the February 8, 2013, issue of ESPN the Magazine.

They received seven Grammy award nominations at the 56th Annual Grammy Awards, which included Best New Artist, Album of the Year, Song of the Year ("Same Love"), and Best Music Video ("Can't Hold Us"). On January 26, 2014, Macklemore & Ryan Lewis won four Grammy awards including those for Best New Artist, Best Rap Album (The Heist), Best Rap Song and Best Rap Performance ("Thrift Shop"). Some rap critics took issue with Macklemore's win over Kendrick Lamar for Best Rap Album. In an interview with The Source, Macklemore said that Lamar had a better rap album, and acknowledged that the hip hop community would be justified in feeling that Kendrick was robbed that year.

== Discography ==
- The Heist (2012)
- This Unruly Mess I've Made (2016)

== Tours ==
- The Heist Tour (2012–13)
- The Fall Tour (2013–14)
- This Unruly Mess I've Made Tour (2016)

== See also ==
- List of Billboard Hot 100 number ones of 2013
- Hip hop music in the Pacific Northwest
- Grammy Award for Best New Artist
