= Macklemore & Ryan Lewis discography =

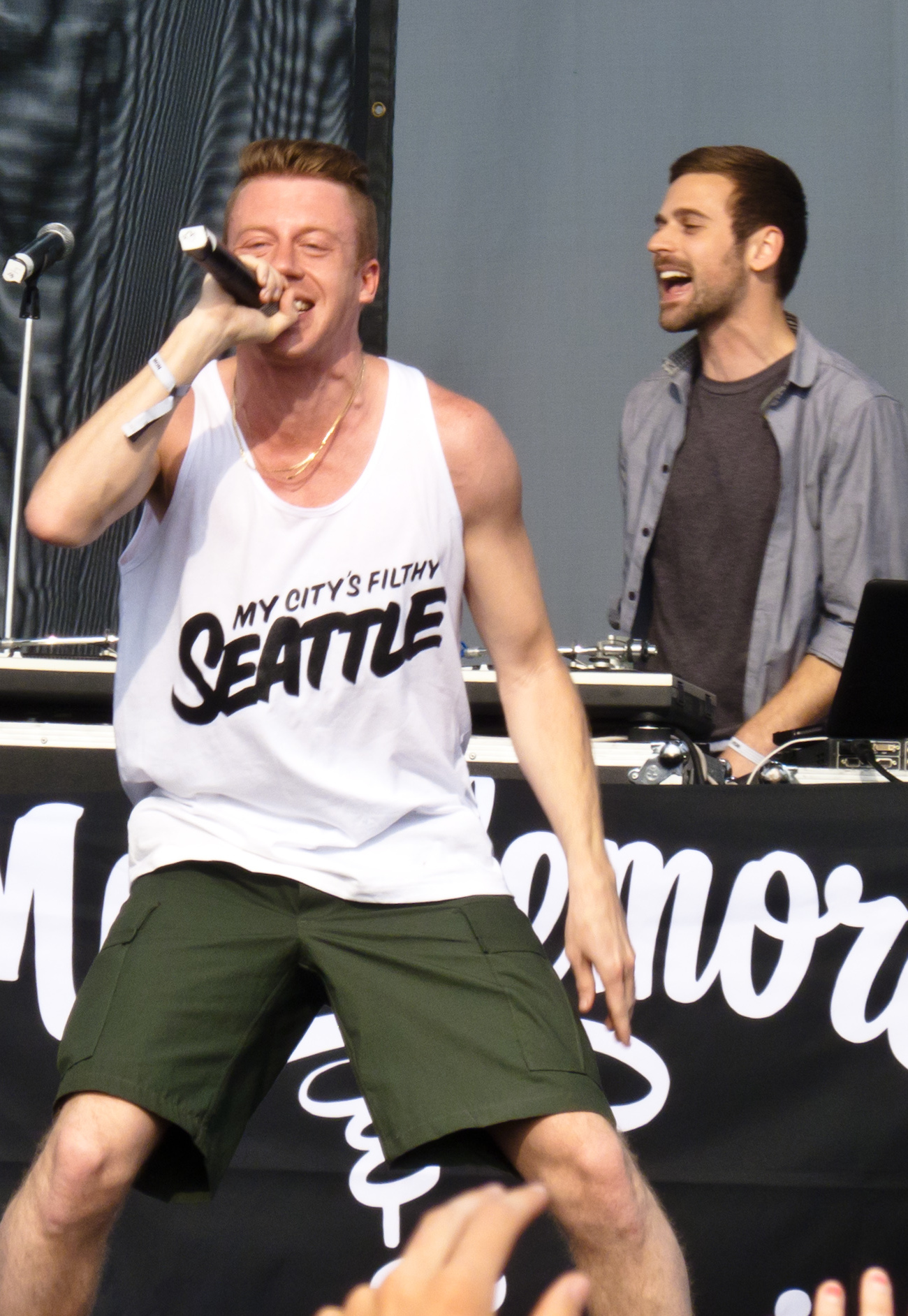
- Macklemore & Ryan Lewis in 2011
- Studio albums: 2
- EPs: 2
- Singles: 17
- Music videos: 15

The discography of American hip hop duo Macklemore & Ryan Lewis consists of two studio albums, two extended plays, 17 singles and 15 music videos. Macklemore and Lewis' single "Thrift Shop" reached number one on the US Billboard Hot 100 in 2013. The single was soon dubbed the first song since 1994 to top the Hot 100 chart without the support of a major record label by Billboard, although Macklemore, in a slightly unusual recording contract, pays a nominal percentage of sales for the usage of Warner Bros. Records' radio promotion department to push the releases of their singles.

Their second single, "Can't Hold Us", also peaked at number one on the Hot 100, making Macklemore and Lewis the first duo in the chart's history to have their first two singles both reach the peak position. Macklemore and Lewis released their debut studio album The Heist on October 9, 2012, which charted at number two on the US Billboard 200. The pair was nominated for seven Grammy awards at the 56th Annual Grammy Awards, winning four awards, including Best New Artist, Best Rap Album (The Heist), Best Rap Song and Best Rap Performance ("Thrift Shop"). As of April 2019, the music video for "Thrift Shop" has amassed over 1.3 billion views on YouTube. Macklemore & Ryan Lewis released their second studio album This Unruly Mess I've Made on February 26, 2016, charting at number four on the Billboard 200. The album was supported by its lead single "Downtown", which peaked at number twelve on Billboard Hot 100.

== Studio albums ==
List of studio albums, with selected chart positions, sales figures and certifications
Title	Album details	Peak chart positions										Certifications
Title	Album details	US	US R&B	AUS	BEL (FL)	CAN	FRA	GER	IRL	NZ	UK	Certifications
The Heist	Released: October 9, 2012; Formats: CD, LP, digital download, streaming; Label: Macklemore	2	1	2	11	4	19	6	6	1	19	RIAA: 5× Platinum; ARIA: 2× Platinum; BPI: Platinum; BVMI: Platinum; FIMI: Platinum; MC: Platinum; RMNZ: Platinum; SNEP: Platinum
This Unruly Mess I've Made	Released: February 26, 2016; Formats: CD, digital download, streaming; Label: Macklemore	4	1	6	10	4	31	4	6	5	16	

== Extended plays ==
List of extended plays
Title	Details
The Vs. EP	Released: November 27, 2009; Format: Digital download; Label: Macklemore
The Vs. Redux	Released: October 20, 2010; Format: Digital download; Label: Macklemore

== Singles ==
=== As lead artist ===
List of singles as lead artist, with selected chart positions and certifications
Title	Year	Peak chart positions										Certifications	Album
Title	Year	US	AUS	BEL (FL)	CAN	FRA	GER	IRL	NL	NZ	UK	Certifications	Album
"Wings"	2011	— (Note: "Wings" did not enter the Billboard Hot 100, but peaked at number 12 on the Bubbling Under Hot 100 chart, which acts as an extension to the Hot 100.)	17	—	—	155	—	—	—	—	—	RIAA: Platinum; ARIA: Platinum; BPI: Silver; RMNZ: Platinum	The Heist
"Can't Hold Us" (featuring Ray Dalton)	2011	1	1	2	2	3	2	3	4	4	3	RIAA: Diamond; ARIA: 13× Platinum; BEA: 2× Platinum; BPI: 6× Platinum; FIMI: 5× Platinum; BVMI: Platinum; MC: 4× Platinum; RMNZ: 10× Platinum; SNEP: Gold	The Heist
"Same Love" (featuring Mary Lambert)	2012	11	1	11	4	19	25	6	13	1	6	RIAA: 4× Platinum; ARIA: 6× Platinum; BPI: Platinum; FIMI: Gold; MC: Platinum; RMNZ: 3× Platinum	The Heist
"Thrift Shop" (featuring Wanz)	2012	1	1	1	1	1	2	1	1	1	1	RIAA: Diamond; ARIA: 11× Platinum; BEA: Gold; BPI: 2× Platinum; BVMI: 3× Gold; MC: Diamond; RMNZ: 6× Platinum	The Heist
"White Walls" (featuring Schoolboy Q and Hollis)	2013	15	34	52	17	65	17	30	—	6	26	RIAA: 3× Platinum; ARIA: Gold; BPI: Silver; RMNZ: 2× Platinum	The Heist
"Downtown" (featuring Eric Nally, Melle Mel, Kool Moe Dee and Grandmaster Caz)	2015	12	1	6	8	37	30	2	35	3	11	RIAA: Platinum; ARIA: 5× Platinum; BEA: Gold; BPI: Platinum; FIMI: Platinum; RMNZ: 3× Platinum	This Unruly Mess I've Made
"Dance Off" (featuring Idris Elba and Anderson .Paak)	2016	—	7	63	—	137	—	59	—	29	—	ARIA: Platinum; RMNZ: Platinum	This Unruly Mess I've Made
"—" denotes releases that did not chart or were not released in that territory.

=== As featured artist ===
List of singles as featured artist, with selected chart positions
Title	Year	Peak chart positions				Album
Title	Year	US Rock	AUS	AUT	GER	Album
"Arrows" (Fences featuring Macklemore & Ryan Lewis)	2014	24	31	19	8	Lesser Oceans

=== Promotional singles ===
List of singles as lead artist, with selected chart positions
Title	Year	Peak chart positions		Certifications	Album
Title	Year	AUS	NZ	Certifications	Album
"Otherside" (Remix) (featuring Fences)	2011	—	37		Non-album single
"Irish Celebration"	2011	—	88		The Vs. EP
"My Oh My"	2011	—	—		The Heist
"Growing Up" (featuring Ed Sheeran)	2015	—	—	RMNZ: Gold	This Unruly Mess I've Made
"White Privilege II" (featuring Jamila Woods)	2016	—	—		This Unruly Mess I've Made
"Brad Pitt's Cousin" (featuring Xperience)	2016	40	— (Note: "Brad Pitt's Cousin" did not enter the NZ Top 40 Singles Chart, but peaked at number 9 on the NZ Heatseeker Singles Chart.)		This Unruly Mess I've Made
"—" denotes releases that did not chart or were not released in that territory.

== Other charted songs ==
List of songs, with selected chart positions
Title	Year	Peak chart positions	Album
Title	Year	US R&B	Album
"Ten Thousand Hours"	2012	41	The Heist
"Make the Money"	2012	— (Note: "Make the Money" did not enter the US Hot R&B/Hip-Hop Songs chart, but peaked at number six on the Bubbling Under R&B/Hip-Hop Singles chart, which acts as an extension to the Hot R&B/Hip-Hop Songs chart.)	The Heist
"—" denotes releases that did not chart or were not released in that territory.

== Music videos ==
=== As lead artist ===
List of music videos as lead artist, with directors, showing year released
Title	Year	Director(s)
"My Oh My"	2011	Jason Koenig
"Irish Celebration"	2011	Stephan Gray
"Wings"	2011	Zia Mohajerjasbi
"Otherside" (Remix)	2011	Jason Koenig, Ryan Lewis, Ben Haggerty
"Victory Lap"	2012	Johnny Valencia
"Thrift Shop"	2012	Jon Jon Augustavo, Ryan Lewis, Ben Haggerty
"Same Love"	2012	Jon Jon Augustavo, Ryan Lewis
"Can't Hold Us"	2013	Jon Jon Augustavo, Jason Koenig, Ryan Lewis
"White Walls"	2013	Ben Haggerty, Ryan Lewis, Jason Koenig
"Downtown"	2015	Ryan Lewis, Jason Koenig, Ben Haggerty
"Kevin"	2016	Ryan Lewis, Jason Koenig, Ben Haggerty
"Brad Pitt's Cousin"	2016	Mitchell Overton, John Peterson
"Dance Off"	2016	Ryan Lewis, Jason Koenig

=== As featured artist ===
List of music videos as featured artist, with directors, showing year released
Title	Year	Artist	Director(s)
"Arrows"	2014	Fences	Jason Koenig, John Keatley
