= Gemini (Macklemore album) =

Studio album by Macklemore
- Released: September 22, 2017
- Studios: Macklemore's home studio (Seattle, Washington); The Gift Shop (Los Angeles, California)
- Genre: Pop-rap
- Length: 60:19
- Labels: Bendo; Warner Music
- Producers: Budo; Jake One; Macklemore; Sam Wish; Tyler Dopps

Macklemore chronology
The Unplanned Mixtape (2009)	Gemini (2017)	Ben (2023)

Macklemore album chronology
The Language of My World (2005)	Gemini (2017)	Ben (2023)

Singles from Gemini
- 1. "Glorious" Released: June 15, 2017; 2. "Marmalade" Released: July 26, 2017; 3. "Good Old Days" Released: September 19, 2017

Gemini is the second solo studio album by American rapper Macklemore. It was released on September 22, 2017, via Bendo & distributed by Warner Music. The first album he released without producer Ryan Lewis since his 2005 solo effort The Language of My World, Gemini is devoid of any political subject matter.

The album was supported by three singles, "Glorious", "Marmalade" and "Good Old Days". It received generally positive reviews from critics.

== Background ==
Gemini marks Macklemore's second solo studio album. In an interview with Rolling Stone, Macklemore said of the album: "It's not extremely politically motivated or heavily subject- or concept-oriented. I think it's mostly the music that I wanted to hear. It's the music that I wanted to go get into my car and listen to. I wanted it to be fun." He told Beats 1 radio host Zane Lowe about his new approach for this album: "I always try to get a different palette of sounds and textures and vibes. This album, I was in a good place man. There's some darker songs, for sure, but for the most part, if I'm in a happy place and life is good, that's going to be reflected in the music."

On August 22, 2017, Macklemore unveiled the album's track list and cover art. He released a video teaser of the song "Willy Wonka", a collaboration with Offset, on September 8, 2017. It features behind-the-scenes footage of the recording process.

== Singles ==
"Glorious" was released as the lead single from the album on June 15, 2017. It features a guest appearance from American singer Skylar Grey. Its music video was released on July 6, 2017, in which Macklemore was seen traveling around Modesto, California with his grandmother.

The second single from the album, "Marmalade", was released on July 26, 2017. It features a guest appearance from American rapper Lil Yachty.

The collaboration with American singer-songwriter Kesha, "Good Old Days" was released as a promotional single from the album on September 19, 2017. It was sent to adult contemporary radio October 9, 2017, as the album's third single.

== Critical reception ==
Professional ratings
Aggregate scores
Source	Rating
Metacritic	63/100
Review scores
Source	Rating
AllMusic	4/5 stars
The A.V. Club	C
Entertainment Weekly	B−
Evening Standard	3/5 stars
HipHopDX	2.9/5
Pitchfork	5.4/10
Rolling Stone	3/5 stars
Spectrum Culture	2.75/5

Gemini received generally favorable reviews from music critics. At Metacritic, which assigns a normalized rating out of 100 to reviews from mainstream publications, the album received an average score of 63, based on 8 reviews. Neil Yeung of AllMusic said, "While some fans might prefer Macklemore with Lewis, Gemini is a reminder that before the multi-platinum singles, hit albums, and thrift shop threads, he could handle himself just fine." Jon Dolan of Rolling Stone said, "Macklemore's first post-fame LP minus longtime partner Ryan Lewis finds the Seattle MC unburdened by stardom or the social concern that turns his woke anthems into online firestorms."

Chuck Arnold of Entertainment Weekly gave note of the unevenness and length through the track listing but commended Macklemore for keeping it together with his personality and giving the project a "loose mixtape quality." Clayton Purdom of The A.V. Club criticized the use of "drop-out catchphrases [and] horn solos and minutes-long American Idol-style belting," along with Macklemore's "earnest neediness" in his delivery, concluding that "the rapper's sentimentality and kitchen-sink production ethos land the record alongside Katy Perry's Witness in the post-Hamilton bargain bin."

== Track listing ==
Gemini track listing
No.	Title	Writer(s)	Producer(s)	Length
1.	"Ain't Gonna Die Tonight" (featuring Eric Nally)	Ben Haggerty; Eric Nally; Elan Wright; Dave Dalton; Joshua Karp; Greg Kramer	Macklemore	3:34
2.	"Glorious" (featuring Skylar Grey)	Haggerty; Holly Hafermann; Karp; Tyler Andrews; Tyler Dopps	Dopps; Budo	3:40
3.	"Marmalade" (featuring Lil Yachty)	Haggerty; Miles McCollum; Karp; Andrews; Dopps; Joshua Rawlings	Budo; Dopps	4:24
4.	"Willy Wonka" (featuring Offset)	Haggerty; Karp; Dopps; Kiari Cephus	Budo; Dopps; Macklemore	3:42
5.	"Intentions" (featuring Dan Caplen)	Haggerty; Dopps; Karp; Dan Caplen; Jared Borkowski	Budo; Dopps; Macklemore	3:50
6.	"Good Old Days" (featuring Kesha)	Haggerty; Kesha Sebert; Karp; Andrews; Andrew Joslyn; Sam Wishkoski	Budo	4:00
7.	"Levitate" (featuring Otieno Terry)	Haggerty; Karp; Andrews; Rawlings; Otieno Terry	Macklemore; Budo	3:32
8.	"Firebreather" (featuring Reignwolf)	Haggerty; Karp; Andrews; Rawlings	Budo	3:25
9.	"How to Play the Flute" (featuring King Draino)	Haggerty; Dopps; Andrews	Dopps	3:28
10.	"Ten Million"	Haggerty; Karp; Dopps; Andrews	Budo; Dopps	2:59
11.	"Over It" (featuring Donna Missal)	Haggerty; Dopps; Karp; Rawlings; Andrews; Kristine Flaherty; Caplen; Donna Missal; Samuel Ahana	Swish; Macklemore; Budo; Dopps	3:38
12.	"Zara" (featuring Abir)	Haggerty; Dopps; Andrews; Eric Keith; Abir	Dopps	3:37
13.	"Corner Store" (featuring Dave B and Travis Thompson)	Haggerty; Jacob Dutton; Wishkoski; Dopps; Karp; David Bowman; Travis Thompson	Jake One; Sam Wish; Dopps	4:33
14.	"Miracle" (featuring Dan Caplen)	Haggerty; Karp; Dopps; Andrews; Caplen; Andrew Joslyn	Dopps; Budo	3:44
15.	"Church" (featuring Xperience)	Haggerty; Karp; Andrews	Budo; Macklemore	4:10
16.	"Excavate" (featuring Saint Claire)	Haggerty; Karp; Andrews; John Sinclair	Budo	3:56
Total length:				60:19

Notes

- "Glorious" features background vocals from Adam Aejaye Jackson, Will Wheaton, Oren Waters, Valerie Pinkston, Bridgett Bryant, Niomisha Renee Wilson, Harrison White, and Brenda McClure; and additional vocals from Donna Missal.
- "Firebreather" features background vocals from Grace Love and Tyler Andrews.
- "How to Play the Flute", "Corner Store", and "Excavate" feature background vocals from Tyler Andrews.
- "Church" features additional vocals from Jerome Welch.

== Charts ==
=== Weekly charts ===
Weekly chart performance for Gemini
Chart (2017)	Peak position
Australian Albums (ARIA)	3
Austrian Albums (Ö3 Austria)	6
Belgian Albums (Ultratop Flanders)	25
Belgian Albums (Ultratop Wallonia)	17
Canadian Albums (Billboard)	1
Czech Albums (ČNS IFPI)	2
Danish Albums (Hitlisten)	13
Dutch Albums (Album Top 100)	9
Finnish Albums (Suomen virallinen lista)	5
French Albums (SNEP)	16
German Albums (Offizielle Top 100)	10
Irish Albums (IRMA)	6
Italian Albums (FIMI)	8
Latvian Albums (LaIPA)	18
New Zealand Albums (RMNZ)	3
Norwegian Albums (VG-lista)	3
Scottish Albums (Official Charts)	29
Slovak Albums (IFPI)	5
Spanish Albums (Promusicae)	33
Swedish Albums (Sverigetopplistan)	7
Swiss Albums (Schweizer Hitparade)	3
UK Albums (Official Charts)	13
US Billboard 200	2
US Independent Albums (Billboard)	1
US Top R&B/Hip-Hop Albums (Billboard)	1

=== Year-end charts ===
2017 year-end chart performance for Gemini
Chart (2017)	Position
Australian Albums (ARIA)	58
French Albums (SNEP)	153
US Top R&B/Hip-Hop Albums (Billboard)	72

2018 year-end chart performance for Gemini
Chart (2018)	Position
French Albums (SNEP)	190

== Certifications ==
Certifications for Gemini
Region	Certification	Certified units/sales
Australia (ARIA)	Gold	35,000^{‡}
Canada (Music Canada)	Gold	40,000^{‡}
France (SNEP)	Gold	50,000^{‡}
Italy (FIMI)	Gold	25,000^{‡}
United States (RIAA)	Platinum	1,000,000^{‡}
^{‡} Sales+streaming figures based on certification alone.

== Gemini Tour ==
Gemini
- Tour by Macklemore
- Start date: October 6, 2017
- End date: May 6, 2018
- Legs: 3
- No. of shows: 57

=== Setlist ===
1. "Ain't Gonna Die Tonight"
2. "Firebreather"
3. "Marmalade"
4. "Thrift Shop"
5. "White Walls"
6. "Same Love"
7. "Donald Trump"
8. "Willy Wonka"
9. "Drug Dealer"
10. "Intentions"
11. "Corner Store"
12. "Levitate"
13. "Dance Off"
14. "Can't Hold Us"
15. "Good Old Days"
16. "Excavate"
17. "Downtown"
18. "Glorious"

=== Tour dates ===
List of concerts, showing date, city, country and venue
Dates
North America
October 6, 2017	Portland	United States	Roseland Theater
October 7, 2017	Portland	United States	Roseland Theater
October 8, 2017	Eugene	United States	McDonald Theatre
October 11, 2017	San Francisco	United States	The Warfield
October 12, 2017	Los Angeles	United States	Wiltern Theatre
October 14, 2017	Tempe	United States	Marquee Theatre
October 15, 2017	Albuquerque	United States	El Rey Theater
October 17, 2017	Dallas	United States	House of Blues
October 18, 2017	Houston	United States	House of Blues
October 19, 2017	Austin	United States	Emo's
October 29, 2017	Nashville	United States	War Memorial Auditorium
October 31, 2017	Vermillion	United States	University of South Dakota
November 2, 2017	St. Paul	United States	Palace Theatre
November 3, 2017	Milwaukee	United States	The Rave
November 4, 2017	Chicago	United States	House of Blues
November 5, 2017	Detroit	United States	The Fillmore
November 7, 2017	Pittsburgh	United States	Stage AE
November 8, 2017	Toronto	Canada	Rebel
November 10, 2017	New York City	United States	Terminal 5
November 11, 2017	Silver Spring	United States	The Fillmore
November 13, 2017	Philadelphia	United States	The Fillmore
November 14, 2017	Boston	United States	House of Blues
December 22, 2017	Seattle	United States	KeyArena
December 23, 2017	Seattle	United States	KeyArena
Oceania
February 2, 2018	Brisbane	Australia	Riverstage
February 3, 2018	Sydney	Australia	Hordern Pavilion
February 4, 2018	Sydney	Australia	Hordern Pavilion
February 6, 2018	Melbourne	Australia	Festival Hall
February 7, 2018	Melbourne	Australia	Festival Hall
February 9, 2018	Auckland	New Zealand	Spark Arena
February 10, 2018	Wellington	New Zealand	TSB Bank Arena
February 11, 2018	Sydney	Australia	Hordern Pavilion
Europe
March 30, 2018	Manchester	England	Victoria Warehouse
March 31, 2018	Glasgow	Scotland	O2 Academy
April 3, 2018	Dublin	Ireland	3Arena
April 4, 2018	Dublin	Ireland	3Arena
April 6, 2018	London	England	O2 Academy
April 7, 2018	London	England	O2 Academy
April 8, 2018	Birmingham	England	O2 Academy
April 10, 2018	Esch-sur-Alzette	Luxembourg	Rockhal
April 11, 2018	Brussels	Belgium	Forest National
April 13, 2018	Paris	France	Zénith
April 14, 2018	Paris	France	Zénith
April 15, 2018	Amsterdam	Netherlands	AFAS Live
April 17, 2018	Oberhausen	Germany	Turbinenhalle
April 19, 2018	Munich	Germany	Zenith
April 20, 2018	Zürich	Switzerland	Samsung Hall
April 21, 2018	Milan	Italy	Fabrique
April 22, 2018	Milan	Italy	Fabrique
April 24, 2018	Vienna	Austria	Gasometer
April 26, 2018	Warsaw	Poland	Hala Torwar
April 27, 2018	Berlin	Germany	Columbiahalle
April 28, 2018	Hamburg	Germany	Sporthalle
May 1, 2018	Cologne	Germany	Palladium
May 2, 2018	Cologne	Germany	Palladium
May 3, 2018	Offenbach am Main	Germany	Stadthalle
May 5, 2018	Ålgård	Norway	Kongeparken
May 6, 2018	Stockholm	Sweden	Gröna Lund

== See also ==
- List of number-one albums of 2017 (Canada)
