= Ain't Gonna Die Tonight =

2017 song by Macklemore featuring Eric Nally

Song by Macklemore featuring Eric Nally

from the album Gemini
- Released: September 22, 2017
- Recorded: 2017
- Length: 3:34
- Label: Bendo
- Songwriters: Ben Haggerty; Eric Nally; Elan Wright; Dave Dalton; Joshua Karp; Greg Kramer
- Producer: Macklemore

Audio video
- "Ain't Gonna Die Tonight" on YouTube

"Ain't Gonna Die Tonight" is a song by American rapper Macklemore featuring singer Eric Nally, serving as the opening track on Macklemore's 2017 solo album Gemini.

== Background ==
According to Substream Magazine, "Ain't Gonna Die Tonight" reunited Macklemore with Nally, who had previously provided the hook on Macklemore's 2016 single "Downtown," a collaboration credited with raising Nally's profile beyond his work with the band Foxy Shazam. On "Ain't Gonna Die Tonight," Nally's voice is heard before nearly any other element of the track. Nally subsequently joined Macklemore on the North American leg of his fall tour in support of Gemini.

Writing for The Red & Black, Madeline Laguaite described the song as setting "the mood of the album," calling it an "upbeat" track with "light piano and a powerful chorus" from Nally, adding that it "could have been released as a single" on its own and would be "perfect on a running playlist." Laguaite also noted the song's sonic similarity to "Downtown."

== Live performances ==
On September 27, 2017, Macklemore performed "Ain't Gonna Die Tonight" alongside Nally on The Late Late Show with James Corden, shortly before departing for Sydney, Australia, where he was set to headline pre-game entertainment at the NRL Grand Final amid controversy over his planned performance of "Same Love" during Australia's postal survey on marriage equality.

Macklemore also performed "Ain't Gonna Die Tonight" as the opening song of his Gemini tour, including at a sold-out hometown show at KeyArena in Seattle on December 22, 2017. The Seattle Times's Owen R. Smith described Macklemore bursting onto the stage to the song "as cannons fired and singer Eric Nally wailed," immediately turning the show into "a giant dance party."

== Critical reception ==
XXL's Preezy included two lines from "Ain't Gonna Die Tonight" on a list of the 20 best lyrics from Gemini.

== Charts ==
Chart performance for "Ain't Gonna Die Tonight"
Chart (2017)	Peak position
Austria (Ö3 Austria Top 40)	73
New Zealand Heatseekers (Recorded Music NZ)	3
Switzerland (Schweizer Hitparade)	67

== Credits and personnel ==
- Macklemore – vocals, producer, songwriter
- Eric Nally – vocals, songwriter
- Elan Wright – songwriter
- Dave Dalton – songwriter
- Joshua Karp – songwriter
- Greg Kramer – songwriter
