= Brad Pitt (disambiguation) =

Brad Pitt (born 1960) is an American actor and film producer.

Brad Pitt may also refer to:

- Brad Pitt (boxer) (born 1980), Australian boxer
- "Brad Pitt" (song), a song by MØ from the 2022 album Motordrome

== See also ==
- "Brad Pitt's Cousin", a 1993 song by Macklemore & Ryan Lewis featuring Xperience
