= Willy Wonka (song) =

2017 song by Macklemore featuring Offset

Song by Macklemore featuring Offset

from the album Gemini
- Released: September 22, 2017
- Genre: Trap
- Length: 3:42
- Label: Bendo
- Songwriters: Ben Haggerty; Joshua Karp; Tyler Dopps; Kiari Cephus
- Producers: Budo; Dopps; Macklemore

Audio video
- "Willy Wonka" on YouTube

"Willy Wonka" is a song by American rapper Macklemore featuring Offset of Migos. It is the fourth track from Macklemore's 2017 album Gemini, which was released on September 22, 2017. Macklemore posted a preview video of the song on Twitter two weeks earlier. He and Offset performed it on Jimmy Kimmel Live! in late September 2017.

== Background ==
Macklemore posted a preview of "Willy Wonka" on Twitter on September 8, 2017. The video shows Macklemore and Offset shooting basketball, then recording in a home studio. Macklemore records his part first, and Offset records his verse afterward.

== Music and lyrics ==
Rolling Stone called the beat trap. XXL described the instrumental in the preview video as spacey and uptempo. AllMusic's Neil Z. Yeung wrote that the lyrics treat the title character as an icon and a model for success.

Macklemore's verse mentions Boosie Badazz, Rick Ross, and his own song "Thrift Shop". Rolling Stone also lists Marshawn Lynch and Barack Obama. In one line he calls himself an icon in python boots who has met the president. Another lyric, about pulling up in candy paint, refers to Veruca Salt. In the preview video, Offset raps that he has more flavor than Willy Wonka and that he took women to Benihana and then flew to Punta Cana.

== Critical reception ==
Yeung named "Willy Wonka" a highlight of Gemini. In Pitchfork, Jonah Bromwich wrote that Macklemore imitates the flows of Offset and Lil Yachty on the song. He called Offset's list of reasons that Willy Wonka is a sensible role model one of the album's brief pleasures.

Anna Kaplan of The Stranger wrote that the lyrics were not necessarily problematic, but that she could not believe the song was real. Her editor compared it to a Saturday Night Live sketch that turned out to be genuine. Kaplan disliked the preview video, in which Macklemore reads his lyrics from a phone.

== Live performances ==
Macklemore and Offset performed the song on Jimmy Kimmel Live! in late September 2017. XXL reported that it was Macklemore's second television performance in a few days, after he performed "Good Old Days" with Kesha on Ellen. Rolling Stone wrote that two horn players joined the performance and that Offset sang the chorus and a verse.

On June 8, 2018, Macklemore performed the song at The Forum in Inglewood, California, on The Adventures of Kesha and Macklemore tour. He came out dressed as Willy Wonka. He had placed golden tickets under two seats, and the winners watched the performance from inflatable mattresses on stage.

== Credits and personnel ==
- Macklemore – vocals, songwriting, production
- Offset – vocals, songwriting
- Budo – songwriting, production
- Tyler Dopps – songwriting, production
