= List of number-one songs of 2019 (Malaysia) =

Below is a list of songs that topped the RIM Charts in 2019 according to the Recording Industry Association of Malaysia.

== Chart history ==
The yellow background indicates the most streamed international song of 2019.

The green background indicates the most streamed domestic song of 2019.

Issue Date	International & Domestic songs			Domestic songs		
Issue Date	Song	Artist(s)	Ref.	Song	Artist(s)	Ref.
3 January	"Sunflower"	Post Malone and Swae Lee		"Pulang"	Insomniacks	
10 January	"Sunflower"	Post Malone and Swae Lee		"Pulang"	Insomniacks	
17 January	"Sunflower"	Post Malone and Swae Lee		"Pulang"	Insomniacks	
24 January	"7 Rings"	Ariana Grande		"Pulang"	Insomniacks	
31 January	"7 Rings"	Ariana Grande		"Pulang"	Insomniacks	
7 February	"7 Rings"	Ariana Grande		"Di Matamu"	Sufian Suhaimi	
14 February	"7 Rings"	Ariana Grande		"Di Matamu"	Sufian Suhaimi	
21 February	"7 Rings"	Ariana Grande		"Pulang"	Insomniacks	
28 February	"7 Rings"	Ariana Grande		"Pulang"	Insomniacks	
7 March	"7 Rings"	Ariana Grande		"Pulang"	Insomniacks	
14 March	"7 Rings"	Ariana Grande		"Pulang"	Insomniacks	
21 March	"7 Rings"	Ariana Grande		"Bisa Aja"	Faizal Tahir	
28 March	"7 Rings"	Ariana Grande		"Bisa Aja"	Faizal Tahir	
4 April	"On My Way"	Alan Walker, Sabrina Carpenter and Farruko		"Donde"	Andi Bernadee	
11 April	"Kill This Love"	Blackpink		"Forevermore"	Yuna	
18 April	"Boy with Luv"	BTS featuring Halsey		"Kisah Cinta Kita"	Hafiz Suip	
25 April	"Boy with Luv"	BTS featuring Halsey		"Kisah Cinta Kita"	Hafiz Suip	
2 May	"Boy with Luv"	BTS featuring Halsey		"Donde"	Andi Bernadee	
9 May	"Boy with Luv"	BTS featuring Halsey		"Donde"	Andi Bernadee	
16 May	"I Don't Care"	Ed Sheeran and Justin Bieber		"Sumpah"	Naim Daniel	
23 May	"I Don't Care"	Ed Sheeran and Justin Bieber		"Sumpah"	Naim Daniel	
30 May	"Boy with Luv"	BTS featuring Halsey		"Bikers Kental"	Akim Ahmad and Faizal Tahir	
6 June	"I Don't Care"	Ed Sheeran and Justin Bieber		"Sumpah"	Naim Daniel	
13 June	"I Don't Care"	Ed Sheeran and Justin Bieber		"Pulang"	Insomniacks	
20 June	"It's You"	Ali Gatie		"Pulang"	Insomniacks	
27 June	"Señorita"	Shawn Mendes and Camila Cabello		"Pulang"	Insomniacks	
4 July	"Señorita"	Shawn Mendes and Camila Cabello		"Pulang"	Insomniacks	
11 July	"Señorita"	Shawn Mendes and Camila Cabello		"Pulang"	Insomniacks	
18 July	"Señorita"	Shawn Mendes and Camila Cabello		"Mimpi"	K-Clique featuring Alif	
25 July	"Señorita"	Shawn Mendes and Camila Cabello		"Mimpi"	K-Clique featuring Alif	
1 August	"Señorita"	Shawn Mendes and Camila Cabello		"Pulang"	Insomniacks	
8 August	"Señorita"	Shawn Mendes and Camila Cabello		"Pulang"	Insomniacks	
15 August	"Señorita"	Shawn Mendes and Camila Cabello		"Mimpi"	K-Clique featuring Alif	
22 August	"Señorita"	Shawn Mendes and Camila Cabello		"Mimpi"	K-Clique featuring Alif	
29 August	"Señorita"	Shawn Mendes and Camila Cabello		"Mimpi"	K-Clique featuring Alif	
5 September	"Señorita"	Shawn Mendes and Camila Cabello		"Mimpi"	K-Clique featuring Alif	
12 September	"Señorita"	Shawn Mendes and Camila Cabello		"Mimpi"	K-Clique featuring Alif	
19 September	"Won't Cry"	Jay Chou and Ashin		"Mimpi"	K-Clique featuring Alif	
26 September	"Won't Cry"	Jay Chou and Ashin		"Mimpi"	K-Clique featuring Alif	
3 October	"Someone You Loved"	Lewis Capaldi		"Mimpi"	K-Clique featuring Alif	
10 October	"Circles"	Post Malone		"Mimpi"	K-Clique featuring Alif	
17 October	"Memories"	Maroon 5		"Mimpi"	K-Clique featuring Alif	
24 October	"Memories"	Maroon 5		"Mimpi"	K-Clique featuring Alif	
31 October	"Memories"	Maroon 5		"Mimpi"	K-Clique featuring Alif	
7 November	"Memories"	Maroon 5		"Mimpi"	K-Clique featuring Alif	
14 November	"Memories"	Maroon 5		"Mimpi"	K-Clique featuring Alif	
21 November	"Memories"	Maroon 5		"Mimpi"	K-Clique featuring Alif	
28 November	"Memories"	Maroon 5		"Mimpi"	K-Clique featuring Alif	
5 December	"Dance Monkey"	Tones and I		"Mimpi"	K-Clique featuring Alif	
12 December	"Dance Monkey"	Tones and I		"Mimpi"	K-Clique featuring Alif	
19 December	"Dance Monkey"	Tones and I		"Mimpi"	K-Clique featuring Alif	
26 December	"Dance Monkey"	Tones and I		"Mimpi"	K-Clique featuring Alif	
