= What If I Told You That I Love You =

2020 Song by Canadian singer Ali Gatie

Single by Ali Gatie

from the EP The Idea of Her
- Released: January 23, 2020
- Genre: R&B
- Length: 3:13
- Label: Li$n; Warner
- Songwriter(s): Danny Schofield; Ali Gatie; Samuel Wishkoski
- Producer(s): Ali Gatie; DannyBoyStyles; Sam Wish

Ali Gatie singles chronology
"It's You" (2019)	"What If I Told You That I Love You" (2020)	"Running on My Mind" (2020)

Music video
- "What If I Told You That I Love You" on YouTube

"What If I Told You That I Love You" is a song by Iraqi–Canadian singer and songwriter Ali Gatie, It was released at January 23, 2020, as a single through Li$n and Warner Records. The song was written by Danny Schofield, Ali Gatie, Samuel Wishkoski and produced by Ali Gatie, DannyBoyStyles, Sam Wish.

== Background ==
Gatie told Rolling Stone about the song's inspiration: “Everyone’s been in that situation where they weren’t sure if they should confess their feelings or keep it to themselves, and most of the time you regret not saying how you feel.”

The song is a breezy, sex & springtime-fresh midtempo track, with Gatie's sparkling vocals caressing the sparse beat from producers DannyBoyStyles and Sam Wish.

== Music video ==
The music video was released on March 3, 2020, directed by Justin Abernethy. It featured Gatie sitting alone at a diner, reflected on a love interest.

And clips have a nostalgic vibe, set in an American diner, a bowling alley and a retro car. Think dimmed neon lighting, seamless transitions and plenty of couples making and breaking.

== Remix ==
Dutch future house DJ and producer Don Diablo remixed the track "What If I Told You That I Love You" on April 4, 2020.

== Charts ==
=== Weekly charts ===
Chart (2020)	Peak position
Australia (ARIA)	46
Austria (Ö3 Austria Top 40)	8
Belgium (Ultratip Bubbling Under Flanders)	4
Belgium (Ultratip Bubbling Under Wallonia)	4
Canada (Canadian Hot 100)	34
Canada CHR/Top 40 (Billboard)	12
Canada Hot AC (Billboard)	40
Denmark (Tracklisten)	18
France (SNEP)	172
Germany (GfK)	8
Hungary (Single Top 40)	31
Ireland (IRMA)	49
Netherlands (Single Top 100)	22
Norway (VG-lista)	16
Portugal (AFP)	47
Sweden (Sverigetopplistan)	29
Switzerland (Schweizer Hitparade)	4
UK Singles (OCC)	57
US Billboard Hot 100	95
US Adult Pop Airplay (Billboard)	37
US Hot R&B/Hip-Hop Songs (Billboard)	46
US Pop Airplay (Billboard)	33

=== Year-end charts ===
Chart (2020)	Position
Canada (Canadian Hot 100)	81
Switzerland (Schweizer Hitparade)	87

== Certifications ==
Region	Certification	Certified units/sales
Australia (ARIA)	Gold	35,000^{‡}
Austria (IFPI Austria)	Gold	15,000^{‡}
Brazil (Pro-Música Brasil)	Platinum	40,000^{‡}
Canada (Music Canada)	2× Platinum	160,000^{‡}
Denmark (IFPI Danmark)	Gold	45,000^{‡}
France (SNEP)	Gold	100,000^{‡}
Germany (BVMI)	Gold	200,000^{‡}
New Zealand (RMNZ)	Gold	15,000^{‡}
Portugal (AFP)	Gold	5,000^{‡}
Switzerland (IFPI Switzerland)	Gold	10,000^{‡}
United Kingdom (BPI)	Silver	200,000^{‡}
United States (RIAA)	Platinum	1,000,000^{‡}
^{‡} Sales+streaming figures based on certification alone.
