= Sam Wishkoski =

American producer, songwriter, and multi-instrumentalist

Samuel Benjamin Wishkoski
- Also known as: Sam Wish; SWISH
- Origin: Seattle, Washington, United States
- Genres: R&B; soul; hip-hop
- Occupations: Songwriter; producer; keyboardist; strings
- Years active: 2011–present

Sam Wishkoski is an American R&B producer, songwriter, and multi-instrumentalist best known for writing and/or producing "Good Old Days", "What If I Told You That I Love You", "Dance Off", and "It's You".

Wishkoski became a protege of producer Jake One after one of his high-school teachers (coincidentally a mutual friend of the producer) made the introduction. After releasing debut mixtape SwimSuits under outfit Stevie and Sam inspired by the soundscapes of Kanye West and The Weeknd, he began to work with local Seattle group The Physics in 2011 as a keyboardist appearing on acclaimed single "Seward Park", while also playing keyboards on several Brother Ali projects and producing or writing alongside Jake One. Wishkoski and Jake One became known for "Swish And Chips": a popular online series of musical samples for upcoming producers to make their own musical creations from. Wishkoski moved to Los Angeles to continue writing and producing for other artists after graduating from University of Washington in 2015.

== Selected songwriting and production credits ==
Credits are courtesy of Discogs, Tidal, Spotify, and AllMusic.

Title	Year	Artist	Album
"French Inhale" (featuring Mike Posner)	2011	Snoop Dogg & Wiz Khalifa	Mac & Devin Go to High School (OST)
"Designer Drug"	2013	Mayer Hawthorne	Where Does This Door Go
"Do It" (featuring Mayer Hawthorne)	2013	Pitbull	Meltdown (EP)
"Poor Decisions" (Wale featuring Rick Ross & Lupe Fiasco)	2013	Maybach Music Group	Self Made Vol. 3
"The Great Americans" (Rick Ross featuring Gunplay, Rockie Fresh & Fabolous)	2013	Maybach Music Group	Self Made Vol. 3
"True Colors"	2016	The Weeknd	Starboy
"Dance Off" (featuring Anderson .Paak & Idris Elba)	2016	Macklemore & Ryan Lewis	This Unruly Mess I've Made
"Good Old Days" (featuring Kesha)	2017	Macklemore	Gemini
"Corner Store" (featuring Dave B & Travis Thompson)	2017	Macklemore	Gemini
"Don't Sleep on Me" (featuring Future & 24hrs)	2017	Ty Dolla Sign	Beach House 3
"Bad Business"	2017	21 Savage	Issa Album
"It's You"	2019	Ali Gatie	You (EP)
"Hit My Phone" (featuring Kehlani)	2020	Megan Thee Stallion	Suga (EP)
"What If I Told You That I Love You"	2020	Ali Gatie	The Idea of Her (EP)
"Miss Me"	2020	Lil Tecca	Virgo World
"Can You Blame Me" (featuring Lucky Daye)	2020	Kehlani	It Was Good Until It Wasn't
"Overpriced Steak"	2020	Nasty C	Zulu Man with Some Power
"How Many Times"	2020	Nasty C	Zulu Man with Some Power
"Clouded"	2020	Brent Faiyaz	Fuck the World (EP)
"Been Away"	2020	Brent Faiyaz	Fuck the World (EP)
"The Other Side"	2021	Jazmine Sullivan	Heaux Tales
"Someone like U" (interlude)	2021	Ariana Grande	Positions (Deluxe Edition)
"Trust Fall"	2021	Bebe Rexha	Better Mistakes
"Roster"	2022	Jazmine Sullivan	Heaux Tales, Mo Tales: The Deluxe
"BPW"	2022	Jazmine Sullivan	Heaux Tales, Mo Tales: The Deluxe
"Price of Fame"	2022	Brent Faiyaz	Wasteland
"Ambeyoncé" (featuring Smino)	2022	EarthGang	Ghetto Gods
"Any Given Sunday" (featuring Blxst)	2022	Kehlani	Blue Water Road
"1984"	2023	Macklemore	Ben
"Mad in Love"	2024	Jennifer Lopez	This Is Me... Now
"Bearded Legend"	2024	Freeway & Jake One	The Stimulus Package 2
"Hit You Where It Hurts"	2025	Coco Jones	Why Not More?
"Patty Cake"	2025	De La Soul	Cabin in the Sky

== Awards and nominations ==
Year	Ceremony	Award	Result	Ref
2019	ASCAP Pop Awards	Award-Winning Songs ("Good Old Days")	Won	
