= Transit (rapper) =

Canadian rapper

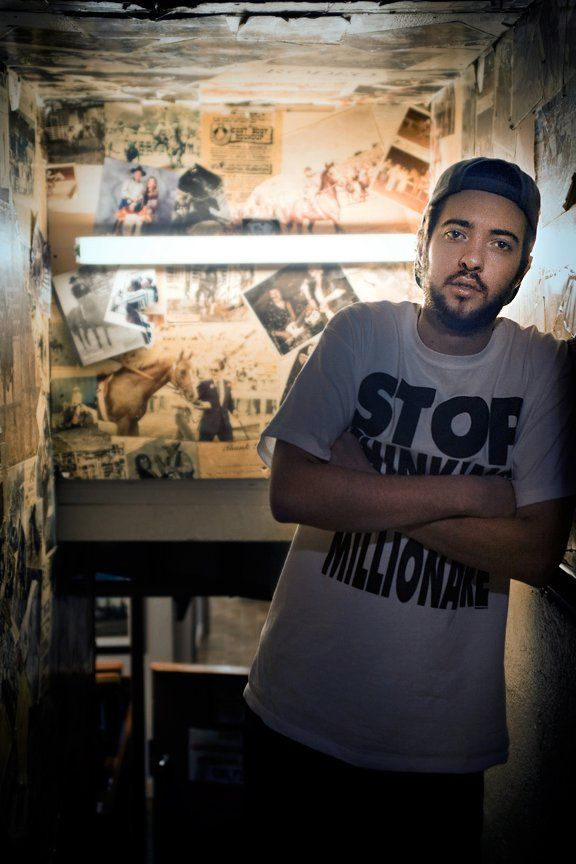
- Transit22 in 2011

Background information
- Also known as: Transit22
- Born: Daniel Bennett; May 18, 1989 (age 37); Red Deer, Alberta, Canada
- Origin: Victoria, British Columbia
- Genre: Hip-hop
- Occupations: Rapper, poet
- Years active: 2007–present
- Label: Independent
- Website: www.transit22.com

Daniel "Transit22" Bennett (born May 18, 1989 in Red Deer, Alberta, Canada), performing under the stage name Transit22, is a Western Canadian Music Award and Independent Music Award nominated hip-hop artist, a Calgary poet laureate finalist and a winner of a Lieutenant Governor of Alberta Emerging Artist Award based in Calgary, Alberta.

Transit has released 6 albums, and has purchased collaborations from Rhymesayers recording artist Grieves, Sims of Doomtree, Astronautalis, Madchild of Swollen Members, and 8-time Juno Award winner Jann Arden. He has received national media coverage including features on Global TV, CTV, CBC TV, Shaw TV, CBC Radio One, in Maclean's Magazine, and regular MuchMusic rotation of his music videos, which have also gotten substantial support online with over 1,000,000 views on YouTube.

Transit has toured as a headliner several times and has also supported tours of Canada, the United States, and Europe with Doomtree, Astronautalis, Swollen Members, Apathy & Celph Titled, and Zion I, has shared stages with internationally recognized names like Mac Miller, Tech N9ne, Murs, Hilltop Hoods, Dirty Heads, Down With Webster, Shad, and 54–40, and has been selected to showcase at prestigious festivals like SXSW, CMW, and Breakout West. Transit has also been awarded several FACTOR, Alberta Music, and SOCAN Foundation grants to further the development of his career.

== History ==
After releasing multiple group projects while growing up in Victoria, BC, Transit moved to Calgary, Alberta to attend Ambrose University College. He started working at the Boys & Girls Clubs' Beltline Youth Centre educating youth about hip-hop music and recording. While still attending college Transit released his first solo project "Insufficient Funds" on September 24, 2010

In 2011, together with collaborator Dave Wallace, Transit undertook an "8 hour challenge" in order to produce a Top 40 style song in under eight hours to illustrate how formulaic he believes pop music is. The results were posted on YouTube and the video went viral.

Transit's second album, titled "22", was released September 24, 2011. It reached #2 on the Canadian iTunes hip-hop chart on November 18, 2011. 22 featured the song "Calgary" featuring 19-time Juno Nominee Jann Arden on the chorus of the song, and "I'm So Indie" which spawned a viral video of the same name that received over 600,000 views on YouTube. Transit organized his first 2 tours of Canada to help create additional awareness.

On August 21, 2012 Transit released a free EP titled "Public Domain", which featured Madchild from Swollen Members and Kyprios (formerly of Sweatshop Union). He organized another DIY headlining tour of Western Canada following this release.

Jan 3, 2013 saw the release of Transit's 3rd full-length album "Stale", which featured Rhymesayers recording artist Grieves and another guest appearance from Kyprios. Transit toured Western Canada with Zion I and Europe with Apathy & Celph Titled in support of the release.

Transit's fifth project titled "Super Man Took Steroids" was released January 21, 2014 and debuted #4 on the Canadian iTunes hip-hop charts. He was invited to showcase at the SXSW music festival shortly after the album was released, and followed it up with his first 2 American tours with Astronautalis as well as a Western Canadian tour with Swollen Members. In 2015, "Super Man Took Steroids" won an award in the "Rap/Hip-Hop Album" category at The 14th Annual Independent Music Awards. Bennett has been known to bring through young talent from the Calgary hip-hop scene. He continues to do so on "Super Man Took Steroids" with the inclusion of young rappers Jam and The Blue.

February 24, 2015 brought the release of Transit's "Occupy Tall Trees" project, which includes 6 new songs (featuring Sims of Doomtree among others) and 13 of his most popular songs from previous projects. The release of this project coincided with Transit supporting a Western American tour with Doomtree and Busdriver, followed by his second time showcasing at SXSW.

In late 2016, Bennett changed his stage name from Transit to Transit22 in order to distinguish himself from American rock band, Transit.
