= Winter & the Wolves =

Studio album by Grieves
- Released: March 25, 2014
- Genre: Hip-hop
- Length: 51:57
- Label: Rhymesayers Entertainment
- Producers: Grieves, B. Lewis

Grieves chronology
Together/Apart (2011)	Winter & the Wolves (2014)	Running Wild (2017)

Professional ratings
Aggregate scores
Source	Rating
Metacritic	58/100
Review scores
Source	Rating
AllMusic	4/5 stars
Alternative Press	2/5 stars
HipHopDX	3/5 stars
Pitchfork	4.7/10

Winter & the Wolves is the fourth studio album by American hip-hop artist Grieves. It was released on Rhymesayers Entertainment in 2014. It peaked at number 57 on the Billboard 200 chart.

== Critical reception ==
At Metacritic, which assigns a weighted average score out of 100 to reviews from mainstream critics, Winter & the Wolves received an average score of 58% based on 4 reviews, indicating "mixed or average reviews".

== Track listing ==
No.	Title	Length
1.	"Rain Damage"	4:00
2.	"Whoa Is Me"	2:43
3.	"Over You" (featuring B. Lewis)	4:24
4.	"Serpents"	3:44
5.	"Breath of Air"	4:14
6.	"Astronauts" (featuring Slug)	3:51
7.	"Autumn"	3:05
8.	"How's It Gonna Go" (featuring B. Lewis)	4:26
9.	"Recluse"	3:19
10.	"Like Child"	2:50
11.	"Long One"	3:21
12.	"Kidding Me"	4:30
13.	"Shreds"	3:07
14.	"Smoke in the Night"	4:23

== Charts ==
Chart	Peak position
US Billboard 200	57
US Independent Albums (Billboard)	10
US Top R&B/Hip-Hop Albums (Billboard)	13
US Rap Albums (Billboard)	7
