= Marmalade (Macklemore song) =

Single by Macklemore featuring Lil Yachty

Single by Macklemore featuring Lil Yachty

from the album Gemini
- Released: July 26, 2017
- Recorded: November 8, 2016
- Studio: Various: Macklemore Studios (Seattle, WA) The Gift Shop (Los Angeles, CA)
- Genre: Bubblegum rap
- Length: 4:21
- Label: Bendo
- Songwriters: Ben Haggerty; Miles McCollum; Joshua Karp; Tyler Andrews; Tyler Dopps; Joshua Rawlings
- Producers: Budo; Tyler Dopps

Macklemore singles chronology
"Glorious" (2017)	"Marmalade" (2017)	"Good Old Days" (2017)

Lil Yachty singles chronology
"Hip Hopper" (2017)	"Marmalade" (2017)	"Faking It" (2017)

Music video
- "Marmalade" on YouTube

"Marmalade" is a song by American rapper Macklemore featuring fellow American rapper Lil Yachty. It was written by the artists alongside Tyler Andrews & Joshua Rawlings and producers Joshua Karp & Tyler Dopps. The song was released through Bendo on July 26, 2017, as the second single from Macklemore's second solo studio album, Gemini (2017).

== Background ==
On June 9, 2017, Yachty posted a photo of the two rappers together on Instagram. In an interview with XXL, talking about the photo, Yachty said that he and Macklemore "worked on something really dope" and he "really think people are going to love it". On July 24, 2017, Macklemore posted a half-complete single artwork on Instagram, captioning: "Dropping another track this week". He later posted the full artwork, along with release details. Macklemore premiered the song during his appearance on Zane Lowe's Beats 1 radio show. During the show, he praised Yachty for his originality and willingness to remain true to himself. He said he wanted to collaborate with Yachty because he is "super dope". He continued: "I've always been a fan of him. I think that he brings a new, young voice to the game and [he's] completely himself and not afraid to do him. And I just appreciate that." He also revealed that the song was recorded on November 8, 2016, which was the same day of the 2016 United States presidential election.

== Critical reception ==
Carl Lamarre of Billboard called the song a "joyous record" and it "finds the Seattle star skating through the track with the aid of Auto-Tune". Brian Josephs of Spin regarded the song as "the candy-coated follow-up" to Macklemore's previous single "Glorious". Aaron Williams of Uproxx called the song a "catchy, upbeat jam", and felt that it "combines the best of both". Similarly, Josiah Hughes of Exclaim! wrote that the song "offers the best of what both rappers have to offer" and "comes with plinky pianos and plenty of Yachty ad libs". Peter Berry of XXL thinks that the song "sounds pretty good" and "basically typifies the 'bubble gum trap' sound Yachty's been cultivating for the last year or so", he also felt that the instrumental "sounds almost like an ice cream truck". Madeline Roth of MTV News also described the instrumental as "ice cream truck-sounding". Kyle Neubeck of Complex opined that the song is "joyous and lighthearted". Mitch Findlay of HotNewHipHop called the song a "sugary production", while HipHopDX called it a "bubble gum rap single". Rap-Up described the instrumental as "upbeat piano-centric".

== Music video ==
The music video was released on August 2, 2017, and was directed by Jason Koenig and Macklemore. It features kid versions of Macklemore and Lil Yachty, played by Mitchell Savitsky and Dre'moni Watts respectively. The video opens with Macklemore's child version stealing the keys to Macklemore's Maybach and grabbing stacks of money. He drives around the city, picking up Lil Yachty's child doppelgänger and other friends. After they visit Johnny Dang to purchase jewelry, they sneak into a football stadium, finding a group of men deflating footballs, a reference to Deflategate. After kid Macklemore steals Tom Brady's jersey from a locker room (a reference to when Brady's jersey was stolen), he gives it to Marshawn Lynch, who then throws the boys a pool party at his mansion. The clip ends with Macklemore waking up to realize that it had been a dream.

== Credits and personnel ==
Credits adapted from YouTube.

- Macklemore – additional production, writing, lyrics
- Lil Yachty – writing, lyrics
- Budo – producing, writing, piano
- Tyler Dopps – producing, writing, bass, drum programming, engineering
- Tyler Andrews – writing
- Josh Rawlings – writing, organ
- Journey Pollard – background vocals
- Sinai Pollard – background vocals
- Jamaudray White – background vocals
- Larian Burney – background vocals
- Kimora Carson – background vocals
- Elizabeth Howell – background vocals
- Abbie Wright – background vocals
- Gena Brooks – additional background vocals
- Tanisha Brooks – additional background vocals
- Josephine Howell – additional background vocals
- Dana Jackson – additional background vocals
- Karma Johnson – additional background vocals
- Maelu Strange – additional background vocals
- Michael Allen – additional background vocals
- Deshe' Brooks – additional background vocals
- Christopher Harris – additional background vocals
- Malaelupe Samifua – additional background vocals
- Jon Castelli – mixing
- Dale Becker – mastering
- Thomas Mann – additional engineering
- Ingmar Carlson – engineering for mix

== Charts ==
Chart (2017)	Peak position
Australia (ARIA)	80
Canada Hot 100 (Billboard)	49
Czech Republic Singles Digital (ČNS IFPI)	73
New Zealand Heatseekers (RMNZ)	3
Philippines (Philippine Hot 100)	5
Scottish Singles Sales (Official Charts)	86
Slovakia Singles Digital (ČNS IFPI)	82
Switzerland (Schweizer Hitparade)	97
US Bubbling Under Hot 100 (Billboard)	1
US Hot R&B/Hip-Hop Songs (Billboard)	39

== Certifications ==
Region	Certification	Certified units/sales
New Zealand (RMNZ)	Gold	15,000^{‡}
Canada (Music Canada)	Gold	40,000^{‡}
United States (RIAA)	2× Platinum	2,000,000^{‡}
^{‡} Sales+streaming figures based on certification alone.
