= Cabin in the Sky (De La Soul album) =

Studio album by De La Soul
- Released: November 21, 2025
- Genre: Hip-hop
- Length: 70:20
- Label: Mass Appeal
- Producers: Dave; De La Soul; DJ Premier; Erik & Joshua; Jake One; Maseo; Nottz; Pete Rock; Posdnuos; Sam Wish; Supa Dave West

De La Soul chronology
And the Anonymous Nobody... (2016)	Cabin in the Sky (2025)

Legend Has It... chronology
Harlem's Finest: Return of the King (2025)	Cabin in the Sky (2025)	Light-Years (2025)

Singles from Cabin in the Sky
- 1. "The Package" Released: November 6, 2025; 2. "Day in the Sun (Gettin' wit U)" Released: November 14, 2025

CD cover
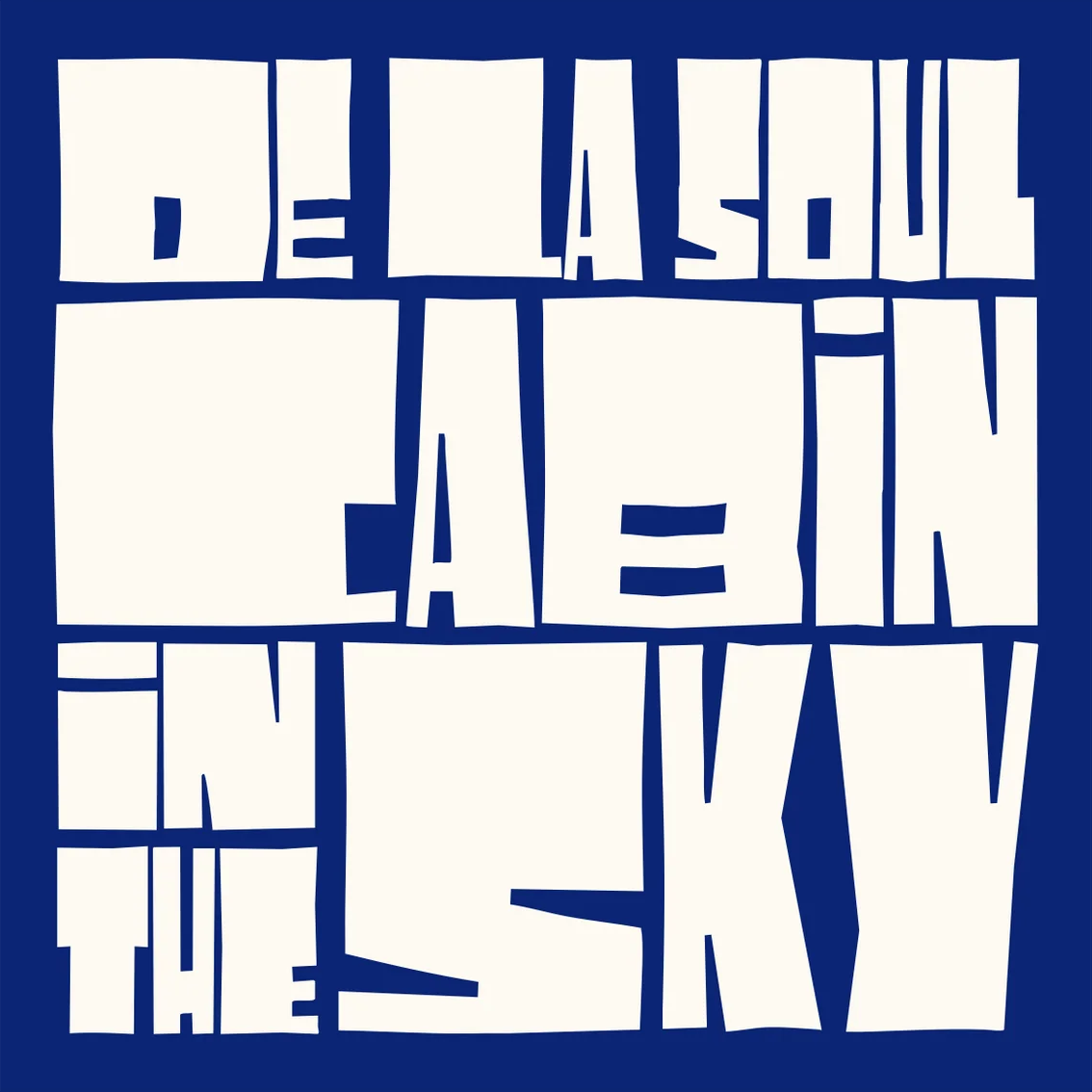

Cabin in the Sky is the ninth studio album by American hip-hop group De La Soul, released on November 21, 2025. It is the group's first album since the death of member Trugoy the Dove, who died in 2023, and features previously unreleased vocals from him. It is the sixth and penultimate album in Mass Appeal's "Legend Has It..." series of albums released in 2025.

== Background ==
A few years prior to the release of Cabin in the Sky, De La Soul had been actively working on getting their Tommy Boy catalogue available to streaming services, taking around a year to license the albums' samples. On February 12, 2023, Trugoy the Dove, also known as Dave, died at the age of 54, with the cause of his death remaining undisclosed. A few weeks later, on March 3, the group's Tommy Boy catalogue was released to streaming services.

In March 2025, De La Soul teased that they would be reuniting with their former producer Prince Paul for a new album. They previously collaborated with him on their first three albums.

On April 16, 2025, Mass Appeal announced a series titled Legend Has It..., which featured seven albums released in 2025 from various artists such as Nas and DJ Premier, Ghostface Killah, Raekwon, Mobb Deep, De La Soul, Big L, and Slick Rick.

== Production ==
Pos and Maseo were personally affected by Dave's death. Instead of shelving the project, they decided to "keep him alive" and "celebrate him" on the album as a two-man unit. The two considered the transition to be a "gigantic adjustment" as they were still doing live performances. Pos revealed that Dave was very picky when it came to production and quality, in which the former wanted to "keep that energy" if the latter was still alive. Prior to Dave's death, De La Soul on various unreleased projects including the album You're Welcome (2013), EP Premium Soul on the Rocks (2014), and AOI 3, the middle of which evolved into Cabin in the Sky.

During the COVID-19 pandemic, Dave played a self-produced beat for Pos and producer Supa Dave West where he says "Ya don't stop" repeatedly throughout the track. Pos extended it as "Yuhdontstop" and saw it as a "cool way to start the album off", claiming that Dave's vocals represent "the heartbeat of" the track. One of the album's songs, "The Package", was supposed to be on a project titled Premium Soul on the Rocks with executive production from Pete Rock and DJ Premier in 2014 but never came to fruition. In addition, according to the group, "Patty Cake" was recorded "a while back." Looking back, Pos and Maseo wanted to include some tracks featuring Dave's vocals on Cabin in the Sky. They initially thought about adding newer production from "certain producers" but decided to "leave those tracks as is."

Pos stated that the album carries a space between loss and light, representing the two's personal pain and joy along with therapy and celebration at the same time. He also revealed that the title for Cabin in the Sky was inspired by the 1943 all-Black musical film of the same name, saying that it reminded him of Dave. When Pos and Maseo were asked why they retained their playful nature on Cabin in the Sky following Dave's death, they responded it as "something that naturally just exists within us", wanting to present their approach to the album authentically and pay tribute to Dave. The two also considered the album's heaven-themed cover art to be an important aspect of Cabin in the Sky, in which they made a creative idea from seeing a sky and thought it could be involved in the title and artwork. The artwork represents Dave's transition to heaven following his death.

== Promotion and release ==
On October 10, 2025, during Pos and Maseo's appearance at a New York Comic Con panel to promote Mass Appeal and Marvel's comic book collaboration based on Legend Has It..., they revealed the title of the album to be Cabin in the Sky, and that it was set for release in November 2025. On November 6, De La Soul release "The Package" as the lead single from the album, beginning its official rollout. On November 14, the group released the album's second single "Day in the Sun (Gettin' wit U)", with features from Q-Tip and Yummy Bingham.

On November 21, Cabin in the Sky was officially released by Mass Appeal Records, with exclusive license from De La Soul. Outside of streaming, the album was physically released on yellow and "sky blue" vinyl, cassette, and CD. It was also released on vinyl with Marvel-based design from artist Edwin Galmon. On November 25, the group appeared as musical guests on Jimmy Kimmel Live!, where they performed "Run It Back!!" and "The Package" as they "gestured to the side screen at one point" to let Dave's vocals play on its own. The latter song was complemented by visuals inspired by album's heaven-themed cover art. On February 5, 2026, De La Soul performed on The Tonight Show Starring Jimmy Fallon. Rolling Stone writer Emily Zemler described it as staged like a music video, with the camera "moving around the stage rather than positioned in a stationary spot."

On March 3, De La Soul performed at NPR Tiny Desk Concerts with a live band, including the album's tracks "Yuhdontstop", "Will Be", "Different World", and "A Quick 16 for Mama". On May 8, the group and Killer Mike released the music video for "A Quick 16 for Mama" with direction from Terrius Mykel. On July 15, De La Soul performed with Ghostface Killah and Slick Rick at the ESPY Awards in celebration of the New York Knicks's NBA championship, which features a performance of "Run It Back!!". On August 19, the group released the music video for "Run It Back!!" with appearances from Nas. It centers on a "stylized police change", with the music video blending "technology, photography, color and visual effects into a moving collage." The music video was directed by Justice Silvera. In September, De La Soul went on Erykah Badu and the Alchemist's Present: Live Tour as a supporting act on seven performances.

== Critical reception ==
Professional ratings
Aggregate scores
Source	Rating
AnyDecentMusic?	7.8/10
Metacritic	81/100
Review scores
Source	Rating
AllMusic	4/5 stars
Clash	8/10
Consumer Guide	B+
The Guardian	3/5 stars
MusicOMH	5/5 stars
NME	4/5 stars
Paste	7.8/10
Pitchfork	7.4/10
Rolling Stone	4/5 stars
The Times	4/5 stars

Cabin in the Sky received widespread acclaim from music critics. At Metacritic, which assigns a normalized rating out of 100 to reviews from mainstream publications, the album received an average score of 81, based on 11 reviews, indicating "universal acclaim".

Robin Murray of Clash wrote that "there's no need to know the full context to enjoy Cabin in the Sky", further stating, "As one of the most straight-forwardly enjoyable hip-hop albums 2025 has offered us, you’d be hard-pushed to top it for entertainment." NME's Fred Garratt-Stanley wrote, "While De La Soul's social commentary is incisive, at its core this is an album about David Jolicoeur and the space he's left behind. In examining the impact he had on their personal and creative lives, the group's surviving members highlight the late rapper's pivotal role in US hip-hop history, and exemplify why they're continually hailed as some of the movement's most treasured voices."

The Guardian's Shaad D'Souza felt that the album can "feel like a slog, with the end lacking the sprightliness of the album's first half".

=== Accolades ===
Publication	Accolade	Rank	Ref.
AllMusic	Best of 2025	—N/a	
Complex	The 50 Best Albums of 2025	40	
HotNewHipHop	The 40 Best Rap Albums of 2025	33	
Paste	The 25 best rap albums of 2025	23	
The Ringer	The 25 Best Albums of 2025	8	
Hip Hop Golden Age	The Best Hip Hop Albums of 2025	1	

== Commercial performance ==
Cabin in the Sky has appeared in album charts from multiple countries upon its release. The album debuted peaked at number 47 on the US Independent Albums chart on the week of December 6, 2025, before doing so at number eleven on the US Top Album Sales chart on the week of February 7, 2026. In addition, on January 13, 2026, it peaked at number 33 on the North American College and Community Radio chart and number two on its hip-hop chart, just below Danny Brown's Stardust (2025).

In the United Kingdom, Cabin in the Sky peaked at number two on R&B Albums, number nine on Independent Albums, and number twelve on Albums Sales charts. In addition, the album appeared in three Japanese charts, peaking at number three on Dance & Soul Albums, number 22 on Western Albums, and number 67 on Download Albums charts. Elsewhere, Cabin in the Sky appeared in album charts from Australia, Belgium, France, Germany, Scotland, and Switzerland.

== Track listing ==
Cabin in the Sky track listing
No.	Title	Writer(s)	Producer(s)	Length
1.	"Cabin Talk (Album Intro)" (with Giancarlo Esposito)	Kelvin Mercer; Vincent Mason	De La Soul	3:18
2.	"Yuhdontstop"	Mercer; Jolicoeur; Mason	Dave	4:06
3.	"Sunny Storms"	Mercer; Mason; Jean Carn; Douglas Davis; James Samuel Harris III; Rose Johnson; Terry Lewis; Chris Martin; Charles Stepney; Ricky Walters	DJ Premier	3:24
4.	"Good Health"	Mercer; Jolicoeur; Mason; David West	Supa Dave West	2:27
5.	"Will Be" (with Yummy Bingham)	Mercer; Mason; Paul Baptiste; Charles Jackson; Victor Orsbron; Eric Robinson; Marvin Yancy	Posdnuos	1:26
6.	"The Package"	Mercer; Jolicoeur; Mason; Peter O'Phillips	Pete Rock	3:13
7.	"A Quick 16 for Mama" (with Killer Mike)	Mercer; Mason; Dominick Lamb; Michael Render	Nottz	2:59
8.	"Just How It Is (Sometimes)" (featuring Jay Pharoah and Gareth Donkin)	Mercer; Mason; Erik Bodin; Joshua Crumbly	Erik & Joshua	4:29
9.	"Cruel Summers Bring Fire Life!!" (with Yukimi)	Mercer; Jolicoeur; Mason; Stephanie Andrews; Roy Ayers; Sara Dallin; Siobhan Fahey; Steve Jolley; Tony Swain; Stevie Wonder; Keren Woodward	Dave; Posdnuos	2:19
10.	"Day in the Sun (Gettin' wit U)" (with Q-Tip and Yummy Bingham)	Mercer; Mason; Kamaal Fareed; James Mtume; Reggie Lucas; West	Supa Dave West	4:17
11.	"Run It Back!!" (featuring Nas)	Mercer; Mason; Nasir Jones; Gordon Sumner; West	De La Soul; Supa Dave West	3:30
12.	"Different World" (featuring Gina Loring)	Mercer; Mason; Lamont Dozier; Brian Holland; Edward Holland; Gina Loring; O'Phillips	Pete Rock	3:38
13.	"Patty Cake"	Mercer; Jolicoeur; Mason; Jacob Dutton; Sam Wish	Jake One; Wish	3:43
14.	"The Silent Life of a Truth"	Mercer; Mason; Martin	DJ Premier	3:39
15.	"En Eff" (with Black Thought)	Mercer; Mason; David Gates; Martin; Tariq Trotter	DJ Premier	4:19
16.	"Believe (In Him)" (with Stout and K. Butler & the Collective)	Mercer; Mason; West	Supa Dave West	4:12
17.	"Yours" (with Common and Slick Rick)	Mercer; Mason; Hans-Jürgen Arkona; Frank Bornemann; Hannes Folberth; Lonnie Lynn; Klaus-Peter Matziol; O'Phillips; Walters	Pete Rock	4:02
18.	"Palm of His Hands" (with Bilal)	Mercer; Mason; O'Phillips; Kiefer Shackelford	Pete Rock; Shackelford; De La Soul	3:48
19.	"Cabin in the Sky"	Mercer; Mason; Mort Garson; Tom Scholz; West	Supa Dave West	3:48
20.	"Don't Push Me"	Mercer; Jolicoeur; Mason; Clifton Chase; Edward G. Fletcher; Melvin Glover; Sylvia Robinson	Dave	3:43
Total length:				70:20

Notes

- Track stylizations:
  - "Yuhdontstop" is stylized "YUHDONTSTOP"
  - "Cruel Summers Bring Fire Life!!" is stylized "Cruel Summers Bring FIRE LIFE!!"
  - "En Eff" is stylized "EN EFF"

== Personnel ==
Credits adapted from Tidal.

De La Soul

- Posdnuos – lead vocals (all tracks), programming (tracks 9, 11, 18)
- Maseo – lead vocals (1–7, 9–15, 17–20), programming (11, 18), background vocals (16)
- Dave – lead vocals (2, 4, 6, 9, 13, 20), programming (2, 9, 11, 18, 20)

Additional musicians

- Giancarlo Esposito – spoken intro (1)
- Black Thought – background vocals (2), lead vocals (15)
- Ebony Brown – background vocals (2)
- Supa Dave West – background vocals (2), programming (4, 10, 11, 16, 19)
- Sean C – background vocals (2, 4)
- DJ Premier – programming (3, 14, 15)
- Jay Pharoah – background vocals (4), lead vocals (8)
- Yummy Bingham – lead vocals (5, 10)
- Pete Rock – programming (6, 12, 17)
- Killer Mike – lead vocals (7)
- Nottz – programming (7)
- Gareth Donkin – lead vocals (8)
- Yukimi – lead vocals (9)
- Q-Tip – lead vocals (10)
- Nas – lead vocals (11)
- Gina Loring – lead vocals (12)
- Sam Wish – keyboards (13), programming (13)
- Jake One – programming (13)
- K. Butler & the Collective – choir vocals (16)
- Stout – lead vocals (16)
- Common – lead vocals (17)
- Slick Rick – lead vocals (17)
- Bilal – lead vocals (18)

Technical

- David P. Kaufman – engineering (all tracks), mixing (18)
- Morgan Garcia – engineering (4, 10, 13)
- Dave Plug 2 – engineering (6, 9)
- Blair Wells – mixing (1, 7)
- Rich Keller – mixing (2, 4, 13, 19, 20)
- DJ Premier – mixing (3, 14, 15)
- Troy Hightower – mixing (5, 8, 16)
- Jamey Stubb – mixing (6, 12, 17)
- Pete Rock – mixing (6)
- Nottz – mixing (7)
- Supa Dave West – mixing (10, 11)
- Scott Slagle – mixing (10, 11)
- Chris Athens – mastering
- Ben Lorenz – sound recording (2)
- Joe Sleep – sound recording (2)
- King of Chill – additional mixing (3, 14, 15)
- Nef – additional mixing (3, 14, 15)
- Parks – additional mixing (3, 14, 15)

== Charts ==
Chart performance for Cabin in the Sky
Chart (2025–2026)	Peak position
Australian Hip Hop/R&B Albums (ARIA)	24
Belgian Albums (Ultratop Flanders)	172
French Physical Albums (SNEP)	141
German Albums (Offizielle Top 100)	30
German Hip-Hop Albums (Offizielle Top 100)	3
Japanese Dance & Soul Albums (Oricon)	3
Japanese Download Albums (Billboard Japan)	67
Japanese Western Albums (Oricon)	22
Scottish Albums (Official Charts)	12
Swiss Albums (Schweizer Hitparade)	31
UK Albums Sales (OCC)	12
UK Independent Albums (Official Charts)	9
UK R&B Albums (Official Charts)	2
US Independent Albums (Billboard)	47
US Top Album Sales (Billboard)	11
US & Canadian College Radio Top 200 (NACC)	33
US & Canadian College Radio Top 30 Hip Hop (NACC)	2

== Release history ==
Release formats for Cabin in the Sky
Region	Date	Format	Label	Ref.
Various	November 21, 2025	CD; digital download; streaming; vinyl; cassette	AOI; Mass Appeal	
