= White Privilege II =

Single by American hip hop duo Macklemore & Ryan Lewis

Promotional single by Macklemore & Ryan Lewis featuring Jamila Woods

from the album This Unruly Mess I've Made
- Released: January 22, 2016
- Genre: Alternative hip hop; indie hip hop
- Length: 8:42
- Label: Macklemore LLC
- Songwriters: Ben Haggerty; Ryan Lewis; Jamila Woods; Hollis Wong-Wear; Ahamefule Oluo; Josh Karp; Evan Flory-Barnes; Josh Rawlings; Darian Asplund; D'Vonne Lewis; Tyler Andrews; Larry Griffin Jr.; G. Reynolds
- Producer: Ryan Lewis

"White Privilege II" is a song by American hip hop duo Macklemore & Ryan Lewis from their second album This Unruly Mess I've Made (2016). The song, a sequel to Macklemore's solo song "White Privilege" from his first album The Language of My World (2005), discusses white privilege and the social movement associated with Black Lives Matter. According to the duo, "this song is the outcome of an ongoing dialogue with musicians, activists, and teachers within our community in Seattle and beyond. Their work and engagement was essential to the creative process." The song's lyrics span around nine minutes and 1,300 words. One of the project's collaborators is Chicago singer Jamila Woods, whose voice is featured on the track. "White Privilege II" was released as promotional single on January 22, 2016.

== Themes ==
The song comments on the impunity with which white police in the United States are free to take black lives, with "a shield, a gun with gloves and hands that gives an alibi." Arguing his success is "the product of the same system that let off Darren Wilson," a police officer who fatally shot Michael Brown, Macklemore raps that, "one thing the American dream fails to mention, is that I was many steps ahead to begin with". The song also samples a line from a woman who dismisses the concept of white privilege, "you're saying that I have an advantage, why? Because I'm white? [scoffs and laughs] What? No."

== Song structure ==
Forrest Wickman, writing for Slate, analyzes the song as having multiple sections that often bear a different critical viewpoint (narrator) from Macklemore himself. "The biggest mistake early reactions to the song have made, pretty consistently, is assuming that everything Macklemore raps is in his own voice." The first verse in his own voice, where Macklemore raps about his struggle to find his place in the protest movement, conscious that his commercial success in hip-hop is at least partially a product of white privilege.

They're chanting out, 'Black lives matter', but I don't say it back. Is it OK for me to say? I don't know, so I watch and stand in front of a line of police that look the same as me.

In the second verse, according to Wickman, the song "zooms out to give a larger perspective," with Macklemore first delivering the case against himself, in the voice of his critics. He then turns his self-consciousness about cultural appropriation to other white performers, rapping, "we take all we want from black culture, but will we show up for black lives?" He names the performers Miley Cyrus, Iggy Azalea, and Elvis Presley as having "exploited and stolen the music, the moment / the magic, the passion, the fashion you toyed with / the culture was never yours to make better." He seems to put special attention on Iggy Azalea, rapping, "fake and so plastic, you've heisted the magic / you've taken the drums and the accent you rapped in / you're branded hip-hop; it's so fascist and backwards / That Grandmaster Flash'd go slap it". Wickman writes that the "many, many headlines" that construe this verse as being a "callout" or a "slam" are missing "the larger point, which is that his real target here is himself." He observes that the line supposedly accusing Azalea of "heisting the magic," is really a self-criticism: The Heist was Macklemore and Ryan Lewis' debut album. Meera Jagannathan of the New York Daily News noted that Iggy Azalea was blindsided, tweeting a fan, "he shouldn't have spent the last three years having friendly convos and taking pictures together at events, etc. if those were his feelings." Wickman argues Iggy Azalea seems to have "missed the point," echoing a protest chant sampled in the song, "It's not about you!"

The third verse by Wickman's same analysis, "whips the camera around, to turn it on Macklemore's more ignorant fans," taking on the voice of a white mom "who asks to take a selfie with Macklemore, praising him at the expense of the rest of hip-hop, which she backhandedly slanders." In this verse, as Black Lives Matter protesters chant outside, the "mom" tells Macklemore:

You're the only hip hop I let my kids listen to, because you get it. All that negative stuff isn't cool. Like all the guns and the drugs, the bitches and hoes, and the gangs and the thugs, even the protest outside, so sad and so dumb – if the cop pulls you over, it's your fault if you run!

Wickman notes the "irony" with which many fans initially seemed to endorse the mom's comments literally on song interpretation site Genius, with such annotations as, "Macklemore makes positive hip-hop and doesn't romanticize bad behavior like most rappers do." The section concludes with samples from white critics of the Black Lives Matter movement, skeptical of the concept of white privilege and believing that they live in a post-racial America.

The fourth verse resumes in with Macklemore as narrator, followed by quotes from Black Lives Matter supporters, including a critique of the hashtag All Lives Matter using a metaphor: "if there's a subdivision and a house is on fire...the fire department wouldn't show up and put water on all the houses because all houses matter, they would show up and turn on their water on the house that was burning because that's the house that needs help the most." The song then ends with Jamila Woods singing, "Your silence is a luxury. Hip-hop is not a luxury. What I got for me, it is for me? What we made, we made to set us free." Woods' line is a reference to black feminist poet Audre Lorde's essay "Poetry Is Not a Luxury."

== Critical reception ==
Spencer Kornhaber, a reviewer for The Atlantic, called the song "both a statement—don't just be aware of racism, speak up about it—and a demonstration...Macklemore is practicing what he preaches, as he preaches it. He also spotlights the voices of actual black activists. Who could attack him for that? I can't. This is a brave song." However, he also criticizes the song for not using enough subtle artistry to convey his message, "forgoing metaphor or ambiguity or impressionism."

In his review, Wickman said that "White Privilege II" is not "a great song, but as a think piece it's not terrible...the best thing Macklemore does is giving Black Lives Matter protesters (along with up-and-coming singer Jamila Woods) the last word."

Kris Ex of Pitchfork Media called the song a "mess", saying that it's "too much to work as hit and not enough to work as a piece of agitprop." Ex also noted two types of critiques about the song on social media: critiques making references to white savior syndrome, and critiques asserting that Macklemore's widespread recognition for the song was a type of recognition that rappers of color rapping about the same topic have received comparably little attention for, an ironic example of white privilege.

Gyasi Ross, a Native American rapper, lawyer, activist, and author, responded to Macklemore's song by releasing a track called "White Privilege 3", in which he criticized the song for ostensibly critiquing white privilege while simultaneously not letting minority artists speak. Ross commented, "You're trying to help, but honestly you're not. We can speak for ourselves. Pass the mic."

== Chart performance ==
On the first day of its release on January 22, "White Privilege II" reached the #1 position on Billboard + Twitter Trending 140, a chart which ranks songs by how often they are mentioned on Twitter.
