= This Unruly Mess I've Made =

Studio album by Macklemore & Ryan Lewis
- Released: February 26, 2016
- Recorded: 2013–2015
- Genre: West Coast hip-hop; conscious hip-hop; alternative hip-hop; pop rap
- Length: 57:39
- Label: Macklemore LLC; ADA
- Producer: Ryan Lewis; Oboohoo; Budo

Macklemore & Ryan Lewis chronology
| The Heist (2012) | This Unruly Mess I've Made (2016) |

Singles from This Unruly Mess I've Made
- 1. "Downtown" Released: August 27, 2015; 2. "White Privilege II" Released: January 22, 2016; 3. "Dance Off" Released: February 25, 2016; 4. "Brad Pitt's Cousin" Released: April 12, 2016

This Unruly Mess I've Made is the second and final studio album by American hip-hop duo Macklemore & Ryan Lewis. It was released on February 26, 2016, by Macklemore LLC and Alternative Distribution Alliance. Following the success of the duo's hit album The Heist (2012), which earned them their first Grammy wins, the duo delved into lyrical themes that tackle political and social issues, including white privilege, fame and the scrutiny of the media and tabloids. The album was supported by two singles: "Downtown" and "Dance Off", along with "White Privilege II" featuring Jamila Woods, which was released as the album's promotional single.

== Background ==
Following the success of Macklemore and Ryan Lewis' debut album The Heist (2012), Macklemore revealed the album cover artwork for their follow-up album, titled This Unruly Mess I've Made, on January 15, 2016, on an Instagram post. The album was self-released on February 26, 2016. He also revealed on the trailer for their album on his official website, which features himself discussing about how their album was created and their inspiration for making the new music.

== Singles ==
The duo's lead single for This Unruly Mess I've Made, titled "Downtown", was released on August 27, 2015. The song was produced by Ryan Lewis, who co-wrote it with Macklemore. The duo collaborated with artists including Eric Nally, Melle Mel, Kool Moe Dee and Grandmaster Caz on this track. The music video for "Downtown" featuring Eric Nally, Melle Mel, Kool Moe Dee and Grandmaster Caz, was also released on August 27, 2015.

The album's second single, "Dance Off", was released on February 25, 2016, in Australia, New Zealand and selected countries of Europe. The song was not released in the United States. The song contains a dialogue from actor Idris Elba and a guest appearance from American recording artist Anderson .Paak. The music video for "Dance Off" featuring Idris Elba was released on May 17, 2016.

=== Promotional singles ===
"Growing Up (Sloane's Song)" featuring Ed Sheeran, was released on August 5, 2015. The previously-leaked track, "White Privilege II" featuring Jamila Woods, was released on January 22, 2016. "Brad Pitt's Cousin" was released on April 12, 2016, also in Australia and New Zealand. The song features guest vocals from Xperience.

=== Other songs ===
On February 24, 2016, the music video was released for "Kevin" featuring Leon Bridges.

== Release ==
In the weeks and months of predating the album's release, Macklemore and Ryan Lewis shared three songs from the album such as "Downtown" featuring Kool Moe Dee, Melle Mel, Grandmaster Caz and Eric Nally, "Growing Up (Sloane's Song)" featuring Ed Sheeran, and "Kevin" featuring Leon Bridges.

== Critical reception ==
Professional ratings
Aggregate scores
| Source | Rating |
|---|---|
| AnyDecentMusic? | 5.4/10 |
| Metacritic | 59/100 |
Review scores
| Source | Rating |
| AllMusic | 4/5 stars |
| The A.V. Club | C+ |
| Entertainment Weekly | B− |
| The Guardian | 2/5 stars |
| NME | 3/5 |
| Pitchfork | 5.1/10 |
| Rolling Stone | 3/5 stars |
| Spin | 7/10 |
| Vice | A− |
| XXL | 4/5 |

This Unruly Mess I've Made has received generally mixed reviews from music critics. At Metacritic, the score currently has a score of 59 out of 100 based on 17 reviews.

Jeremy Gordon of Pitchfork gave the album a 5.1 out of 10, describing it as "an occasionally inspiring, often corny rap album made for winning Grammy nominations and waking the hearts of the unwoken." Louis Pattison of NME said, "It's equal parts witty and serious, poppy and knotty, cracking wise one minute, then demanding you sit quietly and listen carefully through some complicated soul-searching."

Writing for Rolling Stone, Mark Seliger said of the album, "On Unruly Mess, Macklemore's confrontational side returns..." Ray Rahman of Entertainment Weekly gave the album a grade of B−, saying, "Unruly Mess sees him embracing his role as a social justice champion, sent to expand the minds of his (mainly young, white, suburban) audiences."

== Commercial performance ==
The album debuted at number 4 on the Billboard 200, with 61,000 album-equivalent units; it sold 51,000 copies in its first week in the United States. The album debuted at number one on the US Top R&B/Hip-Hop Albums. The album dropped to number 31 in its second week on the Billboard 200 and left the chart entirely after its seventh.

== Track listing ==
| No. | Title | Writer(s) | Producer(s) | Length |
|---|---|---|---|---|
| 1. | "Light Tunnels" (featuring Mike Slap) | Ben Haggerty; Ryan Lewis; Michael Slavtcheff; Josh Rawlings; Andrew Joslyn; Elan Wright; Joshua Karp | Lewis | 6:37 |
| 2. | "Downtown" (featuring Eric Nally, Melle Mel, Kool Moe Dee and Grandmaster Caz) | B. Haggerty; Lewis; Eric Nally; Melvin Glover; Mohandes Dewese; Curtis Fisher; Karp; Rawlings; Jacob Dutton; Evan Flory-Barnes; Tim Haggerty; Darian Asplund | Lewis | 4:52 |
| 3. | "Brad Pitt's Cousin" (featuring Xperience) | B. Haggerty; Lewis; Tyler Andrews; Rawlings | Lewis | 3:11 |
| 4. | "Buckshot" (featuring KRS-One and DJ Premier) | B. Haggerty; Lewis; Lawrence Parker; Christopher Martin; Rawlings; Cab Calloway; Buster Harding; Jack Palmer | Lewis | 3:33 |
| 5. | "Growing Up (Sloane's Song)" (featuring Ed Sheeran) | B. Haggerty; Lewis; Ed Sheeran; Karp; Owuor Arunga; Rawlings | Lewis | 5:05 |
| 6. | "Kevin" (featuring Leon Bridges) | B. Haggerty; Lewis; Todd Bridges; Karp; Rawlings; Joslyn; Andrews | Lewis | 4:40 |
| 7. | "St. Ides" | B. Haggerty; Lewis; Karp; Rawlings | Lewis | 3:39 |
| 8. | "Need to Know" (featuring Chance the Rapper) | B. Haggerty; Lewis; Chancelor Bennett; Calvin Price; Carl "Cardiak" McCormick | Lewis | 3:52 |
| 9. | "Dance Off" (featuring Idris Elba and Anderson .Paak) | B. Haggerty; Lewis; Idris Elba; Brandon Anderson; Karp; Josh Dobson; Sam Wishkoski; Andrews | Lewis; Karp^{[a]} | 3:49 |
| 10. | "Let's Eat" (featuring Xperience) | B. Haggerty; Lewis; Andrews; Rawlings | Lewis | 2:55 |
| 11. | "Bolo Tie" (featuring YG) | B. Haggerty; Lewis; Keenon Jackson; Stu Phillips; Bob Stone | Lewis | 3:37 |
| 12. | "The Train" (featuring Carla Morrison) | B. Haggerty; Lewis; Carla Morrison; Rawlings; Karp; Andrews | Lewis; Karp^{[b]} | 3:07 |
| 13. | "White Privilege II" (featuring Jamila Woods) | B. Haggerty; Lewis; Jamila Woods; Hollis Wong-Wear; Ahamefule Oluo; Karp; Flory-Barnes; Rawlings; Asplund; D'Vonne Lewis; Andrews; Larry Griffin, Jr.; Glen Reynolds | Lewis; Oboohoo^{[b]}; Karp^{[b]} | 8:42 |
| Total length: | | | | 57:40 |

Digital deluxe edition (bonus tracks)
| No. | Title | Writer(s) | Producer(s) | Length |
|---|---|---|---|---|
| 14. | "The Shades" | B. Haggerty; Lewis; Karp; Rawlings | Lewis | 3:44 |
| 15. | "Spoons" (featuring Ryan Bedard) | B. Haggerty; Lewis; Karp; Rawlings | Lewis | 3:48 |
| Total length: | | | | 64:02 |

Notes

- ^{^[a]} signifies an additional producer.
- ^{^[b]} signifies a co-producer.

== Charts ==
=== Weekly charts ===
| Chart (2016) | Peak position |
|---|---|
| Australian Albums (ARIA) | 6 |
| Australian Urban Albums (ARIA) | 2 |
| Austrian Albums (Ö3 Austria) | 4 |
| Belgian Albums (Ultratop Flanders) | 9 |
| Belgian Albums (Ultratop Wallonia) | 17 |
| Canadian Albums (Billboard) | 4 |
| Czech Albums (ČNS IFPI) | 93 |
| Dutch Albums (Album Top 100) | 15 |
| Finnish Albums (Suomen virallinen lista) | 33 |
| French Albums (SNEP) | 31 |
| German Albums (Offizielle Top 100) | 4 |
| Irish Albums (IRMA) | 6 |
| Italian Albums (FIMI) | 16 |
| New Zealand Albums (RMNZ) | 5 |
| Norwegian Albums (VG-lista) | 17 |
| Swedish Albums (Sverigetopplistan) | 36 |
| Swiss Albums (Schweizer Hitparade) | 3 |
| UK Albums (OCC) | 16 |
| UK R&B Albums (OCC) | 1 |
| US Billboard 200 | 4 |
| US Independent Albums (Billboard) | 1 |
| US Top R&B/Hip-Hop Albums (Billboard) | 1 |

=== Year-end charts ===
| Chart (2016) | Position |
|---|---|
| Australian Albums (ARIA) | 48 |
| Belgian Albums (Ultratop Flanders) | 112 |
| US Top R&B/Hip-Hop Albums (Billboard) | 32 |
