= Together/Apart =

Studio album by Grieves
- Released: June 21, 2011
- Genre: Hip-hop
- Length: 58:30
- Label: Rhymesayers Entertainment
- Producers: Grieves, Budo

Grieves chronology
The Confessions of Mr. Modest (2010)	Together/Apart (2011)	Winter & the Wolves (2014)

Professional ratings
Aggregate scores
Source	Rating
Metacritic	70/100
Review scores
Source	Rating
AllMusic	3.5/5 stars
The A.V. Club	C+
Consequence of Sound	C+
Exclaim!	mixed
HipHopDX	3.5/5 stars
Pitchfork	5.2/10
PopMatters	7/10 stars
Spin	7/10

Together/Apart is the third studio album by American hip-hop artist Grieves. It was released on Rhymesayers Entertainment in 2011. The album features guest appearances from Brother Ali and Krukid.

== Critical reception ==
At Metacritic, which assigns a weighted average score out of 100 to reviews from mainstream critics, Together/Apart received an average score of 70% based on 11 reviews, indicating "generally favorable reviews".

== Track listing ==
No.	Title	Producer(s)	Length
1.	"Light Speed"	Budo	3:51
2.	"Bloody Poetry"	Budo	3:21
3.	"Falling from You"	Budo	4:10
4.	"On the Rocks"	Grieves	3:05
5.	"Sunny Side of Hell"	Grieves	3:57
6.	"Tragic" (featuring Brother Ali)	Budo	3:16
7.	"Boogie Man"	Budo	3:11
8.	"Pressure Cracks"	Grieves	3:44
9.	"No Matter What" (featuring Krukid)	Budo	3:45
10.	"Vice Grip"	Budo	3:49
11.	"Heartbreak Hotel"	Grieves	5:36
12.	"Speak Easy"	Grieves, Budo	2:32
13.	"Prize Fighter"	Budo	3:06
14.	"Wild Thing"	Grieves	4:40
15.	"Growing Pains"	Grieves	3:37
16.	"Against the Bottom"	Budo	3:48

Deluxe edition bonus tracks
No.	Title	Length
17.	"What Do I Got to Lose" (featuring Choklate)	3:25
18.	"I'll Let You Know"	3:39
19.	"Present/Tense (Segment)"	5:12

== Charts ==
Chart	Peak position
US Billboard 200	106
US Heatseekers Albums (Billboard)	1
US Independent Albums (Billboard)	18
US Top R&B/Hip-Hop Albums (Billboard)	21
US Rap Albums (Billboard)	13
