= Glorious (Macklemore song) =

Single by Macklemore featuring Skylar Grey

from the album Gemini
- Released: June 15, 2017
- Genre: Pop rap
- Length: 3:40
- Label: Bendo
- Songwriters: Ben Haggerty; Holly Hafermann; Josh Karp; Tyler Andrews; Tyler Dopps
- Producers: Joshua Karp; Tyler Dopps (add.)

Macklemore singles chronology
"Wednesday Morning" (2016)	"Glorious" (2017)	"Marmalade" (2017)

Skylar Grey singles chronology
"Beneath with Me" (2016)	"Glorious" (2017)	"Stand by Me" (2018)

Music video
- "Glorious" on YouTube

"Glorious" is a song by American rapper Macklemore, featuring American singer Skylar Grey. The song was written by the artists alongside Tyler Andrews and producers Joshua "Budo" Karp and Tyler Dopps. It was released to digital retailers on June 15, 2017, as the lead single from Macklemore's second solo studio album, Gemini (2017). The song was used in a 20-second trailer for the eleventh series of Doctor Who and the trailer for Crazy Rich Asians.

== Background ==
On June 13, 2017, Macklemore teased the single release on social media. He posted a photo of his daughter, Sloane, standing in front of a car, in which the song's title, release date and time were written. He later posted a video that reveals the song's artwork featured artist. Upon release, Macklemore published a social media post, explaining the reason behind a musical break that he and Ryan Lewis are taking as they work on their own music.

"So here it is. The first song from my new album is 'Glorious'. It features the incredibly talented Skylar Grey and was produced by Budo with additional production from Tyler Dopps. It felt like the right record to come back with, embarking on this new chapter of life."

== Composition and critical reception ==
Edwin Ortiz of Complex magazine wrote that the song "provides an uplifting, anthemic vibe that Macklemore uses to put into focus his own legacy and what it means to truly make a mark". Jon Blistein of Rolling Stone magazine wrote: "'Glorious' has rapid percussion and an energizing piano loop. Macklemore unravels a torrent of lyrics that complement Grey's gospel-tinged hook." They regarded the song as "an ode to fresh starts and embracing life".

== Live performances ==
On June 28, 2017, Macklemore made his television debut of the song with Skylar Grey on the American late-night talk show The Tonight Show Starring Jimmy Fallon. Grey handled the piano, with a backing band consisting six background vocalists, a guitarist and percussionist and a three-piece horn section. Arielle Tschinkel of Idolator regarded the performance as "uplifting" and "spirited."

== Music video ==
The music video premiered on YouTube on July 6, 2017. It featured Macklemore's grandmother, Helen, on her 100th birthday, with the two traveling around Modesto, California, doing activities together such as shopping, egging houses, and visiting an arcade.

== Credits and personnel ==
Credits adapted from YouTube.

- Macklemore – composition
- Skylar Grey – composition
- Budo – production, composition, piano, bass, drum programming
- Tyler Andrews – writing
- Tyler Dopps – additional production, composition, synthesizer, additional drum programming, engineering
- Donna Missal – additional vocals
- Raymond Mason – trombone
- Todd M. Simon – trumpet, flügelhorn, euphonium, horn arrangement
- Adam Aejaye Jackson – additional background vocals
- Niomisha Renee Wilson – additional background vocals
- Oren Waters – additional background vocals
- Valerie Pinkston – additional background vocals
- Brenda McClure – additional background vocals
- Harrison White – additional background vocals
- Will Wheaton – additional background vocals
- Bridgett Bryant – additional background vocals
- Josh Rawlings – additional piano
- Jon Castelli – mixing
- Dale Becker – mastering
- Nick Mac – additional engineering
- Sean Kellett – additional engineering

== Charts ==
=== Weekly charts ===
Chart (2017)	Peak position
Australia (ARIA)	2
Austria (Ö3 Austria Top 40)	12
Belgium (Ultratop 50 Flanders)	22
Belgium (Ultratop 50 Wallonia)	27
Canada Hot 100 (Billboard)	27
Czech Republic Airplay (ČNS IFPI)	11
Czech Republic Singles Digital (ČNS IFPI)	8
Denmark (Tracklisten)	32
France (SNEP)	18
Germany (GfK)	15
Hungary (Single Top 40)	37
Hungary (Stream Top 40)	11
Ireland (IRMA)	9
Italy (FIMI)	17
Latvia (DigiTop100)	45
Lebanon Airplay (Lebanese Top 20)	10
Netherlands (Dutch Top 40)	31
Netherlands (Single Top 100)	16
New Zealand (Recorded Music NZ)	1
Norway (VG-lista)	11
Philippines (Philippine Hot 100)	92
Portugal (AFP)	28
Scotland Singles (Official Charts)	20
Slovakia Airplay (ČNS IFPI)	55
Slovakia Singles Digital (ČNS IFPI)	13
Sweden (Sverigetopplistan)	11
Switzerland (Schweizer Hitparade)	17
UK Singles (Official Charts)	23
UK Indie (Official Charts)	1
US Billboard Hot 100	49
US Pop Airplay (Billboard)	19
US Hot Rap Songs (Billboard)	12
US Rhythmic Airplay (Billboard)	21

=== Year-end charts ===
Chart (2017)	Position
Australia (ARIA)	9
Austria (Ö3 Austria Top 40)	48
Belgium (Ultratop Flanders)	86
Canada (Canadian Hot 100)	87
France (SNEP)	74
Germany (Official German Charts)	70
Hungary (Stream Top 40)	46
Italy (FIMI)	94
Netherlands (Single Top 100)	89
New Zealand (Recorded Music NZ)	28
Sweden (Sverigetopplistan)	87
Switzerland (Schweizer Hitparade)	71

Chart (2018)	Position
France (SNEP)	180

== Certifications ==
Region	Certification	Certified units/sales
Australia (ARIA)	6× Platinum	420,000^{‡}
Belgium (BRMA)	Platinum	20,000^{‡}
Canada (Music Canada)	2× Platinum	160,000^{‡}
Denmark (IFPI Danmark)	Platinum	90,000^{‡}
France (SNEP)	Diamond	233,333^{‡}
Italy (FIMI)	2× Platinum	100,000^{‡}
New Zealand (RMNZ)	6× Platinum	180,000^{‡}
Poland (ZPAV)	Platinum	50,000^{‡}
Portugal (AFP)	Gold	5,000^{‡}
United Kingdom (BPI)	Platinum	600,000^{‡}
United States (RIAA)	3× Platinum	3,000,000^{‡}
^{‡} Sales+streaming figures based on certification alone.
