= It's You (Ali Gatie song) =

Song by Canadian singer Ali Gatie

Single by Ali Gatie

from the EP You and the album WHO HURT YOU
- Released: June 14, 2019
- Recorded: 2019
- Length: 3:32
- Label: Li$n; Warner
- Songwriters: Nathan Perez; Andrew Wansel; Samuel Wishkoski; Adrian Allahverdi; Ali Gatie; Nicholas Adam Schiavone
- Producers: Happy Perez; Pop Wansel; Sam Wish; Adriano

Ali Gatie singles chronology
| "Remedy" (2019) | "It's You" (2019) | "Used to You" (2019) |

Music video
- "It's You" on YouTube

"It's You" is a song by Iraqi–Canadian singer and songwriter Ali Gatie, released as a single through Li$n and Warner Records on June 14, 2019. It debuted at number 97 on the US Billboard Hot 100 and peaked at number 70, becoming Gatie's first Hot 100 entry.

== Background ==
According to Gatie, "It's You" was written in 15 minutes. The song was written about his feelings for a girl. Speaking on the conception of the song, he said he was "just feeling the words in that moment and speaking from the heart". The night he wrote the song, he played it on his Instagram Live and people reacted positively to it, recording it and uploading the recording to YouTube. The song quickly gained huge popularity and Gatie attributes this popularity to the "big impact" the song had when it was officially released.

Gatie said the song is about "being vulnerable and trying not to let the fear of heartbreak overcome the joy of love". Billboard described it as Gatie "somberly pleading for a second chance at love despite his jaded past".

== Music video ==
The song's official video was released on July 18, 2019. According to Gatie, the video showcases love in all of its forms and represents "every person or situation that 'It's You' could be for each listener". He described the video as "very diverse" and showcasing "love in different ways".

=== Reception ===
Billboard magazine called the video "intimate" and noted how Gatie's mixture of cultures is displayed throughout: "Gatie riding in the backseat of a car, but the couples shown throughout come from a range of ethnicities and are of various ages".

== Charts ==
=== Weekly charts ===
| Chart (2019) | Peak position |
|---|---|
| Australia (ARIA) | 15 |
| Belgium (Ultratip Bubbling Under Flanders) | 1 |
| Belgium (Ultratip Bubbling Under Wallonia) | 22 |
| Canada (Canadian Hot 100) | 25 |
| Czech Republic Singles Digital (ČNS IFPI) | 42 |
| Denmark (Tracklisten) | 32 |
| France (SNEP) | 164 |
| Germany (GfK) | 72 |
| Ireland (IRMA) | 24 |
| Latvia (LAIPA) | 17 |
| Lebanon (OLT20 Combined Chart) | 9 |
| Lithuania (AGATA) | 25 |
| Malaysia (RIM) | 1 |
| Mexico Ingles Airplay (Billboard) | 17 |
| Netherlands (Single Top 100) | 46 |
| New Zealand (Recorded Music NZ) | 10 |
| Norway (VG-lista) | 17 |
| Portugal (AFP) | 21 |
| Singapore (RIAS) | 7 |
| Slovakia Singles Digital (ČNS IFPI) | 52 |
| Sweden (Sverigetopplistan) | 27 |
| Switzerland (Schweizer Hitparade) | 21 |
| UK Singles (Official Charts) | 45 |
| US Billboard Hot 100 | 70 |
| US Hot R&B/Hip-Hop Songs (Billboard) | 25 |
| US Rolling Stone Top 100 | 29 |

=== Year-end charts ===
| Chart (2019) | Position |
|---|---|
| Australia (ARIA) | 56 |
| Canada (Canadian Hot 100) | 65 |
| Latvia (LAIPA) | 60 |
| Malaysia (RIM) | 5 |
| New Zealand (Recorded Music NZ) | 43 |
| Portugal (AFP) | 71 |
| Switzerland (Schweizer Hitparade) | 55 |
| US Hot R&B/Hip-Hop Songs (Billboard) | 80 |

== Certifications ==
| Region | Certification | Certified units/sales |
|---|---|---|
| Australia (ARIA) | 2× Platinum | 140,000^{‡} |
| Austria (IFPI Austria) | Gold | 15,000^{‡} |
| Brazil (Pro-Música Brasil) | Diamond | 160,000^{‡} |
| Canada (Music Canada) | 5× Platinum | 400,000^{‡} |
| Denmark (IFPI Danmark) | Platinum | 90,000^{‡} |
| France (SNEP) | Gold | 100,000^{‡} |
| Italy (FIMI) | Gold | 35,000^{‡} |
| New Zealand (RMNZ) | 3× Platinum | 90,000^{‡} |
| Poland (ZPAV) | Gold | 25,000^{‡} |
| Portugal (AFP) | 2× Platinum | 20,000^{‡} |
| Spain (Promusicae) | Gold | 30,000^{‡} |
| Switzerland (IFPI Switzerland) | Platinum | 20,000^{‡} |
| United Kingdom (BPI) | Gold | 400,000^{‡} |
| United States (RIAA) | 3× Platinum | 3,000,000^{‡} |
^{‡} Sales+streaming figures based on certification alone.

== Release history ==
| Region | Date | Format | Label | Ref. |
|---|---|---|---|---|
| Various | June 14, 2019 | Digital download; streaming | Warner | |
| United States | August 6, 2019 | Top 40 radio | Warner | |

== See also ==
- List of number-one songs of 2019 (Malaysia)
