= Dance Off =

Single by Macklemore & Ryan Lewis featuring Idris Elba and Anderson .Paak

from the album This Unruly Mess I've Made
- Released: February 25, 2016
- Genre: Hip hop; comedy hip hop
- Length: 3:49
- Label: Macklemore LLC
- Songwriters: Ben Haggerty; Ryan Lewis; Idris Elba; Joshua Karp; Brandon Anderson; Josh Dobson; Sam Wishkoski; Tyler "XP" Andrews
- Producer: Ryan Lewis

Macklemore & Ryan Lewis singles chronology
"Downtown" (2015)	"Dance Off" (2016)	"Brad Pitt's Cousin" (2016)

Idris Elba singles chronology
"Murdah Loves John" (2015)	"Dance Off" (2016)	"Boasty" (2019)

Anderson .Paak singles chronology
"Come Down" (2016)	"Dance Off" (2016)	"Dang!" (2016)

Music video
- "Dance Off" on YouTube

"Dance Off" is a song by American hip hop duo Macklemore & Ryan Lewis featuring British actor and musician Idris Elba and fellow American musician Anderson .Paak, released in the United States, Australia, New Zealand, and selected European countries on February 25, 2016, as the second single from the duo's studio album This Unruly Mess I've Made (2016).

== Background and release ==
Following the large success of the duo's debut album The Heist (2012), Macklemore revealed the This Unruly Mess I've Made release with an Instagram post on January 15, 2016. "Dance Off" was released as second single of the album on February 25, 2016, succeeding "Downtown".

== Music video ==
The song's music video was uploaded to Ryan Lewis's YouTube, now known as Macklemore LLC, channel on May 17, 2016. It was directed by Lewis & Jason Koenig.

== Critical reception ==
The song received positive reviews from music critics. Killian Young said that "Dance Off" makes nod to the pillars of hip hop culture: rapping, DJing, tagging, breakdancing and piano groove. David Turner of MTV said that "Dance Off" sounds like rolling into the morgue by the 27th second, when the song says "I grab my ankle and pull it up / And do that thing where I move my butt". Spencer Kornhaber of The Atlantic commented that the song sounds like the director Vincent Price in "Thriller" (of Michael Jackson), and said that Macklemore "frets about the adequacy of what's between his legs. In his world, music does not help you transcend your insecurities—it heightens them.".

== Chart performance ==
In Australia, "Dance Off" entered the Australian Singles Chart at number twenty one on March 7, 2016.

== Track listing ==
Digital download
No.	Title	Length
1.	"Dance Off" (featuring Idris Elba and Anderson Paak)	3:49

== Charts ==
=== Weekly charts ===
Chart (2016)	Peak position
Australia (ARIA)	7
Belgium (Ultratip Bubbling Under Flanders)	17
France (SNEP)	137
Ireland (IRMA)	59
New Zealand (Recorded Music NZ)	29

=== Year-end charts ===
Chart (2016)	Position
Australia (ARIA)	88
Australia Urban (ARIA)	12

== Certifications ==
Region	Certification	Certified units/sales
New Zealand (RMNZ)	Platinum	30,000^{‡}
Australia (ARIA)	Platinum	70,000^{‡}
^{‡} Sales+streaming figures based on certification alone.

== Release history ==
Region	Date	Label	Format
Australia	February 25, 2016	Macklemore LLC	Digital download
