= Good Old Days (Macklemore song) =

Single by Macklemore featuring Kesha

from the album Gemini
- Released: September 19, 2017
- Genre: Pop
- Length: 4:00
- Label: Bendo
- Composers: Ben Haggerty; Kesha Sebert; Joshua Karp; Andrew Joslyn; Sam Wishkoski; Tyler Andrews
- Lyricists: Ben Haggerty; Kesha Sebert
- Producer: Budo

Macklemore singles chronology
"Marmalade" (2017)	"Good Old Days" (2017)	"These Days" (2018)

Kesha singles chronology
"Praying" (2017)	"Good Old Days" (2017)	"This Is Me" (2017)

Music video
- "Good Old Days" on YouTube

"Good Old Days" is a song by American rapper Macklemore, featuring American singer-songwriter Kesha. It was written by Macklemore, Kesha, Budo, Andrew Joslyn, Sam Wishkoski and Tyler Andrews, with lyrics written by Macklemore and Kesha and production handled by Budo. Originally released as a promotional single on September 19, 2017, the song was sent to adult contemporary radio in the United States on October 9, 2017, as the third single from Macklemore's second solo studio album, Gemini (2017). As of October 9, 2017, "Good Old Days" has sold 48,000 digital copies in the United States according to Nielsen SoundScan.

== Background ==
On January 18, 2017, Macklemore posted a photo of him and Kesha together on Instagram, hinting at an upcoming collaboration. The song first appeared in the track list of Gemini, which was unveiled on August 22, 2017. Macklemore spoke to Rolling Stone about collaborating with Kesha, saying: "Kesha, she is a great spirit. She is someone that I walked into the room and I immediately just caught a vibe with and became friends with pretty instantaneously... She's a musician, she's a writer, she's someone that is not afraid to try ideas in the studio, not afraid to get vulnerable in front of people, not scared to go for the high note when she doesn't know if she can hit it or not. She is a musician in every sense of the word, and she's hilarious." He also revealed that Ryan Lewis facilitated the collaboration. When asked about how he reached out to Kesha, he said: "Well, Ryan had a session with her in Seattle. She was already here. They had already done 'Praying' and they were working on a couple other records that I don't think made her album. She had [an] off day and I hit Ryan and was like, 'Would you mind if I hit up Kesha?' And he was like, 'Of course not.'" Kesha said of the song on Twitter: "My new song with Macklemore reminds me of being 16 chasing wild dreams not knowing those moments would be so precious."

== Critical reception ==
Caitlin Kelley of Billboard deemed "Good Old Days" a "mellow yet catchy pop song". Mark Braboy of Vibe praised Macklemore for showcasing "his best, introspectively rapping", and Kesha providing "some soul-stirring vocals to make the song hit home". Madeline Roth of MTV News wrote that "the nostalgic track is a stripped-back affair". Alex Ungerman‍ of Entertainment Tonight felt Kesha's voice "soars over a piano ballad that is somehow both somber and uplifting in tone". Peter Berry of XXL thinks that the song is "fueled by piano, sentimentality and the sweet vocals of Kesha". Jon Powell of Respect regarded the song as "a pop ballad-esque cut" and "the perfect record for personal reflection and self-love". Derrick Rossignol of Uproxx called the song a "piano-led pop ballad", and felt Kesha's vocal is beautiful and powerful. Anya Crittenton of Gay Star News described the song as "an emotional tune" that "features a simple piano and drum-filled melody". Aron A. of HotNewHipHop wrote: "Kesha handles the hook with her powerful vocals over a soft and simple piano progression". Lindsay Howard of Variance described the song as an "explicitly nostalgic cut".

== Live performances ==
On September 25, 2017, Macklemore performed "Good Old Days" with Kesha on The Ellen DeGeneres Show. They gave their second televised performance of the song at the 2018 Billboard Music Awards on May 20, 2018.

== Credits and personnel ==
Credits adapted from YouTube.

- Macklemore – songwriting
- Kesha – songwriting
- Budo – composing, production
- Andrew Joslyn – production, string arrangement, violin
- Sam Wishkoski – composing, additional piano
- Tyler Andrews – composing
- Christopher Foerstel – violin
- Seth May-Patterson – viola
- Eli Weinberger – cello
- Teo Shantz – additional percussion
- Tanisha Brooks – choir vocals
- Josephine Howell – choir vocals
- Karma Johnson – choir vocals
- Jon Castelli – mixing
- Dale Becker – mastering
- Tyler Dopps – engineering
- Mandy Adams – mastering assistant
- Ingmar Carlson – mixing engineering

== Charts ==
=== Weekly charts ===
Weekly chart performance for "Good Old Days"
Chart (2017–2018)	Peak position
Australia (ARIA)	8
Australia Urban (ARIA)	3
Austria (Ö3 Austria Top 40)	24
Belgium (Ultratip Bubbling Under Flanders)	32
Belgium (Ultratip Bubbling Under Wallonia)	27
Canada Hot 100 (Billboard)	40
Canada AC (Billboard)	40
Canada CHR/Top 40 (Billboard)	25
Canada Hot AC (Billboard)	33
Czech Republic Singles Digital (ČNS IFPI)	34
France (SNEP)	171
Germany (GfK)	50
Hungary (Single Top 40)	34
Hungary (Stream Top 40)	39
Ireland (IRMA)	34
Latvia (DigiTop100)	56
Netherlands (Single Top 100)	80
New Zealand (Recorded Music NZ)	14
Portugal (AFP)	87
Scottish Singles Sales (Official Charts)	64
Slovakia Airplay (ČNS IFPI)	34
Slovakia Singles Digital (ČNS IFPI)	36
Sweden (Sverigetopplistan)	83
Switzerland (Schweizer Hitparade)	24
UK Singles (Official Charts)	79
US Billboard Hot 100	48
US Adult Contemporary (Billboard)	18
US Adult Pop Airplay (Billboard)	3
US Dance Airplay (Billboard)	26
US Hot Rap Songs (Billboard)	19
US Pop Airplay (Billboard)	11
US Rhythmic Airplay (Billboard)	20

=== Year-end charts ===
Year-end chart performance for "Good Old Days"
Chart (2017)	Position
Australia (ARIA)	88
Australia Hip-Hop/R&B Singles (ARIA)	13

Chart (2018)	Position
Australia Hip-Hop/R&B Singles (ARIA)	36
US Adult Contemporary (Billboard)	49
US Adult Pop Airplay (Billboard)	6
US Pop Airplay (Billboard)	40
US Radio Songs (Billboard)	74

== Certifications ==
Certifications for "Good Old Days"
Region	Certification	Certified units/sales
Australia (ARIA)	4× Platinum	280,000^{‡}
Canada (Music Canada)	Platinum	80,000^{‡}
France (SNEP)	Gold	100,000^{‡}
Italy (FIMI)	Gold	25,000^{‡}
Netherlands (NVPI)	Gold	20,000^{‡}
New Zealand (RMNZ)	3× Platinum	90,000^{‡}
United Kingdom (BPI)	Gold	400,000^{‡}
United States (RIAA)	3× Platinum	3,000,000^{‡}
^{‡} Sales+streaming figures based on certification alone.

== Release history ==
Release dates and formats for "Good Old Days"
Region	Date	Format	Label(s)	Ref.
Various (Note: Release as a promotional single.)	September 19, 2017	Digital download	Bendo	
United States	October 9, 2017	Hot adult contemporary	Macklemore	
United States	October 10, 2017	Contemporary hit radio	Macklemore	
