= Downtown (Macklemore & Ryan Lewis song) =

2015 single by Macklemore & Ryan Lewis

Single by Macklemore & Ryan Lewis featuring Eric Nally, Melle Mel, Kool Moe Dee and Grandmaster Caz

from the album This Unruly Mess I've Made
- Released: August 27, 2015
- Recorded: July 2015
- Studio: Robert Lang (Shoreline, Washington); London Bridge (Shoreline, Washington); Avast! (Seattle, Washington)
- Genre: Old-school hip-hop; pop rap
- Length: 4:54
- Label: Macklemore LLC
- Songwriters: Ben Haggerty; Ryan Lewis; Jacob Dutton; Eric Nally; Joshua Karp; Joshua Rawlings; Darian Asplund; Evan Flory-Barnes; Tim Haggerty
- Producers: Lewis; Jake One; Budo

Macklemore & Ryan Lewis singles chronology
"Arrows" (2014)	"Downtown" (2015)	"Dance Off" (2016)

Kool Moe Dee singles chronology
"Wild Wild West" (1999)	"Downtown" (2015)	"Brand New Heat" (2016)

"Downtown" is a song by American hip-hop duo Macklemore & Ryan Lewis featuring fellow American musicians Eric Nally of Foxy Shazam, Melle Mel, Kool Moe Dee, and Grandmaster Caz. The song was officially released on August 27, 2015, as the lead single from the duo's second studio album This Unruly Mess I've Made (2016). A music video for the song was uploaded to Ryan Lewis' YouTube channel on the day of the song's release.

== Background ==
On the song Macklemore said, "Ryan [Lewis] made a beat on the road called 'moping around,' I got the beat, I thought it said moped." "Coincidentally we had both purchased mopeds for being on the road so we could go around, leave the venues that we were performing at, and I wrote a song about mopeds, which now a year and a half later is out in the world."

== Critical reception ==
William Pankey of AXS described the song as a sequel to the duo's breakout single "Thrift Shop", while Larry Miezel Jr. of The Stranger felt it was another "kid-friendly pop-rap stunt-fantasy." Maeve McDermott of USA Today called it "a hip hop recreation of Bruno Mars and Mark Ronson's 'Uptown Funk'." Amaya Mendizabal of Billboard labeled the track as old-school hip-hop.

"Downtown" was ranked at number 18 on the annual Triple J Hottest 100 for 2015.

== Chart performance ==
In the United States, "Downtown" debuted at number 94 on the Billboard Hot 100 chart dated September 12, 2015. Its chart debut was fueled by sales of 11,000 digital downloads in its first two days, along with 886,000 domestic streams during the same period, nearly all from views of the song's music video. The next week, following its first full week of availability and a performance at the 2015 MTV Video Music Awards, the song jumped to number 18 with the week's largest gain in digital download sales, having sold 95,000 copies and logged 5.7 million streams for the week. It has since peaked at number 12. As of November 2015, "Downtown" has sold 772,000 copies domestically. Macklemore and Ryan Lewis also performed the song live on The Tonight Show Starring Jimmy Fallon on September 9, 2015.

In Australia, "Downtown" entered the Australian Singles Chart at number nine as the second highest debut on the week commencing September 7, 2015. The song rose to number two on the week commencing September 14, 2015. On the week commencing October 5, 2015, "Downtown" replaced Justin Bieber's "What Do You Mean?" at number one after being blocked from the position for three weeks, becoming Macklemore & Ryan Lewis' fourth number one single in the country. It has since been certified triple platinum by the Australian Recording Industry Association (ARIA).

== Music video ==
The official music video for the song was uploaded on August 27, 2015, to Ryan Lewis' YouTube channel. It was directed by Macklemore, Lewis, and Jason Koenig, and was filmed in Spokane, Washington. Ken Griffey Jr. is featured in the music video. As of June 2026, it has over 253,000,000 views on YouTube.

== In popular culture ==
=== Media ===
"Downtown" was used in the movie trailers for Dirty Grandpa and The Secret Life of Pets.

In July 2018, the Seattle Police Department created a music video set to "Downtown" as part of a lip-sync video competition between police departments across the United States that was popular at the time.

This was used in the 2018 film Hotel Transylvania 3: Summer Vacation, the song was sung by a group of Fish Men, all voiced by Chris Parnell.

== Track listing ==
Digital download
No.	Title	Length
1.	"Downtown" (featuring Eric Nally, Melle Mel, Kool Moe Dee, and Grandmaster Caz)	4:52

== Charts ==
=== Weekly charts ===
Chart (2015–2016)	Peak position
Australia (ARIA)	1
Australia Urban (ARIA)	1
Austria (Ö3 Austria Top 40)	45
Belgium (Ultratop 50 Flanders)	6
Belgium (Ultratop 50 Wallonia)	26
Canada (Canadian Hot 100)	8
Czech Republic Airplay (ČNS IFPI)	21
Czech Republic Singles Digital (ČNS IFPI)	18
France (SNEP)	37
Germany (Official German Charts)	30
Hungary (Stream Top 40)	19
Ireland (IRMA)	2
Italy (FIMI)	33
Netherlands (Single Top 100)	54
Netherlands (Dutch Top 40)	35
Mexico Ingles Airplay (Billboard)	1
New Zealand (Recorded Music NZ)	3
Scottish Singles Sales (Official Charts)	9
Slovakia Airplay (ČNS IFPI)	40
Slovakia Singles Digital (ČNS IFPI)	19
Spain (PROMUSICAE)	58
Sweden (Sverigetopplistan)	53
Switzerland (Schweizer Hitparade)	48
UK Singles (Official Charts)	11
UK Indie (Official Charts)	2
UK Hip Hop/R&B (Official Charts)	2
US Billboard Hot 100	12
US Hot R&B/Hip-Hop Songs (Billboard)	6
US Mainstream Top 40 (Billboard)	9
US Rhythmic (Billboard)	4

=== Year-end charts ===
Chart (2015)	Position
Australia (ARIA)	11
Australia Urban (ARIA)	4
Belgium (Ultratop Flanders)	75
Canada (Canadian Hot 100)	56
New Zealand (Recorded Music NZ)	38
UK Singles (Official Charts Company)	95
US Billboard Hot 100	84
US Rhythmic (Billboard)	40

Chart (2016)	Position
Australia (ARIA)	100
Australia Urban (ARIA)	16

== Certifications ==
Region	Certification	Certified units/sales
Australia (ARIA)	5× Platinum	350,000^{‡}
Belgium (BRMA)	Gold	10,000^{‡}
Italy (FIMI)	Platinum	50,000^{‡}
New Zealand (RMNZ)	3× Platinum	90,000^{‡}
United Kingdom (BPI)	Platinum	600,000^{‡}
United States (RIAA)	Platinum	1,000,000^{‡}
^{‡} Sales+streaming figures based on certification alone.

== Release history ==
Region	Date	Label	Format
Worldwide	August 27, 2015	Macklemore LLC	Digital download
