= Ali Gatie =

Iraqi-born Canadian singer (born 1997)

Ali Gatie علي غاتي
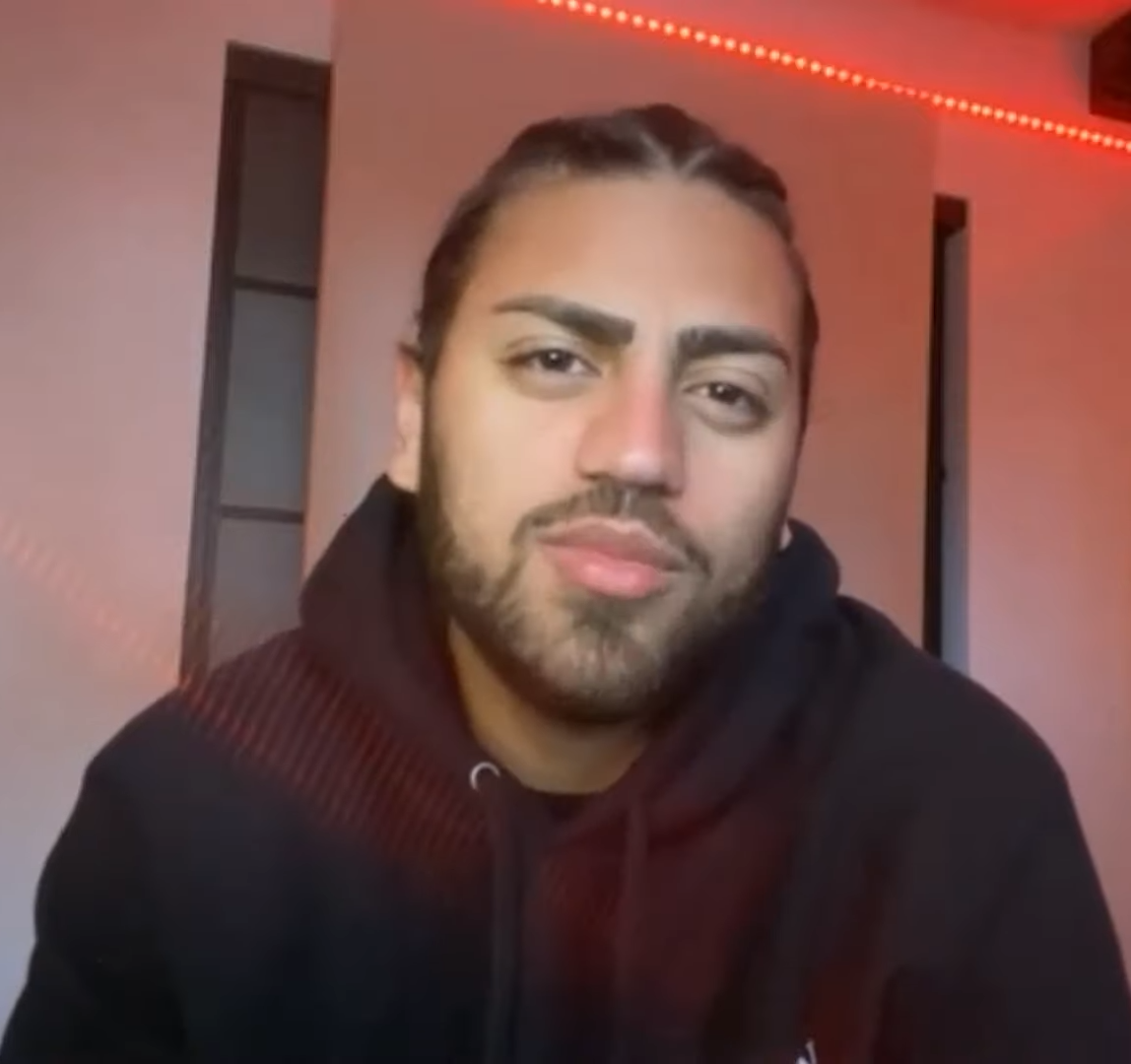
- Gatie in 2021

Background information
- Born: May 31, 1997 (age 29); Aden, Yemen
- Origin: Iraqi–Canadian
- Genres: Pop; R&B
- Occupations: Singer; songwriter
- Instrument: Vocal
- Years active: 2017–present
- Labels: LISN; Warner
- Website: www.aligatie.com

Ali Gatie (Arabic: علي غاتي; born May 31, 1997) is an Iraqi–Canadian singer and songwriter managed by SAL&CO. In 2019, his song "It's You" achieved worldwide success, charting on the US Billboard Hot 100 peaked at number 70 and reaching the top 30 in Australia, Canada, Ireland and Sweden, as well as the top 10 in New Zealand and in Germany.

== Early life ==
Ali Gatie was born in Yemen in 1997 to Iraqi parents. His family moved to Abu Dhabi, United Arab Emirates before settling down outside of Toronto, Canada. He grew up listening to Ed Sheeran, J. Cole and Frank Ocean, who influenced his music.

== Career ==
Ali Gatie, who has been managed by SAL&CO since May 2020 started pursuing a music career at the age of 18 and started to record in 2016. This decision later caused him to drop out of university where he was studying business. In 2017, he won an online RhymeStars competition hosted by Joe Budden. After releasing several singles in 2018, he was signed by Warner Records. His first commercial success came with the release of "Moonlight," which received nearly 14 million views on YouTube. However, the release of "It's You" in June 2019 would become his mainstream breakthrough; an "explosive streaming story", as of December 2019, it had exceeded 650 million streams. On 8 November 2019, Gatie released his debut EP, "You," which was accompanied by a 12-minute film that included seven new songs.

== Discography ==
=== Studio albums ===
Title	Details
Who Hurt You?	Released: 12 August 2022; Label: Lisn, Warner; Format: Digital download, streaming
All the Things I Wish I Said	Released: 1 March 2024; Label: Lisn; Format: Digital download, streaming

=== EPs ===
Title	Details	Peak chart positions				
Title	Details	CAN	NOR	US	US Heat	US R&B
You	Released: 8 November 2019; Label: Lisn, Warner; Format: Digital download, streaming	32	40	123	6	17
The Idea of Her	Released: 26 March 2021; Label: Lisn, Warner; Format: Digital download, streaming	59	—	—	14	—
"—" denotes a recording that did not chart or was not released in that territory.

=== Charted and certified singles ===
Title	Year	Peak chart positions										Certifications	Album
Title	Year	CAN	AUS	GER	IRE	NOR	NZ	SWE	SWI	UK	US	Certifications	Album
"Can't Lie"	2018	—	—	—	—	—	—	—	—	—	—	MC: Gold; RIAA: Gold	Non-album single
"Moonlight"	2018	—	—	—	—	—	—	—	—	—	—	MC: Platinum; RIAA: Gold	You and Who Hurt You?
"It's You"	2019	25	15	72	21	17	10	27	21	45	70	MC: 5× Platinum; ARIA: 2× Platinum; BPI: Gold; IFPI SWI: Platinum; RIAA: 3× Platinum; RMNZ: 3× Platinum	You and Who Hurt You?
"Say to You"	2019	—	—	—	—	—	— (Note: "Say to You" did not enter the NZ Top 40 Singles Chart, but peaked at number 27 on the NZ Hot Singles Chart.)	—	—	—	—		You
"What If I Told You That I Love You"	2020	34	46	8	49	16	— (Note: "What If I Told You That I Love You" did not enter the NZ Top 40 Singles Chart, but peaked at number three on the NZ Hot Singles Chart.)	29	4	57	95	MC: 2× Platinum; ARIA: Gold; BPI: Silver; BVMI: Gold; IFPI SWI: Gold; RIAA: Platinum; RMNZ: Gold	The Idea of Her and Who Hurt You?
"Running on My Mind"	2020	92	—	89	—	—	— (Note: "Running on My Mind" did not enter the NZ Top 40 Singles Chart, but peaked at number 16 on the NZ Hot Singles Chart.)	—	47	—	—		The Idea of Her
"Welcome Back" (featuring Alessia Cara)	2020	84	—	—	—	—	— (Note: "Welcome Back" did not enter the NZ Top 40 Singles Chart, but peaked at number 21 on the NZ Hot Singles Chart.)	—	—	—	— (Note: "Welcome Back" did not enter the Billboard Hot 100, but reached number 31 on the Digital Song Sales component chart.)		Non-album single
"Lie to Me" (with Tate McRae)	2020	76	—	—	—	—	— (Note: "Lie to Me" did not enter the NZ Top 40 Singles Chart, but peaked at number 10 on the NZ Hot Singles Chart.)	—	—	—	—	MC: Gold	The Idea of Her
"Can't Let You Go"	2021	91	—	—	—	—	— (Note: "Can't Let You Go" did not enter the NZ Top 40 Singles Chart, but peaked at number 19 on the NZ Hot Singles Chart.)	—	—	—	—		The Idea of Her
"Do You Believe" (with Marshmello and Ty Dolla Sign)	2021	—	—	—	—	—	— (Note: "Do You Believe" did not enter the NZ Top 40 Singles Chart, but peaked at number 32 on the NZ Hot Singles Chart.)	—	—	—	—		The Idea of Her
"Turning Me Up (Hadal Ahbek)" (with Issam Alnajjar and Loud Luxury)	2021	47	—	—	—	—	—	—	—	—	—	MC: Gold	Baree?
"Butterflies" (with MAX)	2021	—	—	—	—	—	— (Note: "Butterflies" did not enter the NZ Top 40 Singles Chart, but peaked at number 22 on the NZ Hot Singles Chart.)	—	—	—	—	MC: Gold; RIAA: Gold; RMNZ: Gold	Love in Stereo and Who Hurt You?
"—" denotes a recording that did not chart or was not released in that territory.

Other releases

- "I See the Dream (Badna Salam)" (with Massari) (2020)
