= Brad Pitt's Cousin =

Promotional single by Macklemore & Ryan Lewis featuring Xperience

from the album This Unruly Mess I've Made
- Released: April 12, 2016
- Recorded: July 2015
- Genre: Comedy hip hop
- Length: 3:11
- Label: Macklemore LLC
- Songwriters: Ben Haggerty; Ryan Lewis; Josh Rawlings; Tyler "XP" Andrews
- Producer: Ryan Lewis

"Brad Pitt's Cousin" is a hip hop song by American hip hop duo Macklemore & Ryan Lewis featuring American rapper Xperience from their third studio album This Unruly Mess I've Made (2016). The song was released as a promotional single on April 12, 2016, only in Australia and New Zealand.

== Background and release ==
Following the large success of the duo's debut album The Heist (2012), Macklemore revealed the This Unruly Mess I've Made release with an Instagram post on January 15, 2016. "Brad Pitt's Cousin" was released as the third single off of the album on April 12, 2016, succeeding "Dance Off". The song cites the American actor Brad Pitt.

== Critical reception ==
The song received mixed reviews from music critics. Killian Young of Consequence of Sound gave the album overall a 'C−', and said of "Brad Pitt's Cousin": "we have hip hop culture: the awkward interjection from God, and the awful reference to the long-expired 'deez nuts' meme." Spencer Kornhaber of The Atlantic commented that Macklemore "tries to make it seem like he loves being called the actor's ugly relative, and opens with him bragging about his cat's Instagram followers".

== Music video ==
The song's music video was released on April 11, 2016, exclusively to Macklemore's Facebook page. It was recorded in London and directed by Lewis.

== Chart performance ==
In Australia, "Brad Pitt's Cousin" entered the Australian Singles Chart at number 40 on August 6, 2016. The song did not enter the New Zealand Top 40 Singles Chart, but peaked at number 9 on the Heatseekers Singles Chart.

== Track listing ==
Digital download
| No. | Title | Length |
|---|---|---|
| 1. | "Brad Pitt's Cousin" (featuring Xperience (XP)) | 3:11 |

== Charts ==
| Chart (2016) | Peak position |
|---|---|
| Australia (ARIA) | 40 |
| New Zealand Heatseekers (Recorded Music NZ) | 9 |

== Release history ==
| Region | Date | Label | Format |
|---|---|---|---|
| Australia | April 12, 2016 | Macklemore LLC | Airplay |
