= Budo (musician) =

- Born: Joshua Karp; Seattle, Washington, U.S.
- Origin: Brooklyn, New York, U.S.
- Genre: Hip hop
- Occupations: Musician; record producer
- Years active: 2004–present
- Label: Rhymesayers Entertainment

Joshua Karp, better known by his stage name Budo, is an American musician, multi-instrumentalist, and record producer. He is a member of A.R.M. along with M.anifest and Krukid. He is one half of the duo Roger Lion along with Joe Pernice.

== Life and career ==
In 2005, Budo produced tracks for Macklemore's The Language of My World. In 2008, he released a collaborative album with Grieves, titled 88 Keys & Counting. In 2011, he produced tracks for Grieves' album, Together/Apart.

In 2013, Budo released a collaborative single with Grynch, titled "Treadin'", on Fin Records. In that year, he released the solo album, The Finger & the Moon.

== Discography ==
=== Studio albums ===
- Civilized (2005) (with Ricky Pharoe)
- 88 Keys & Counting (2008) (with Grieves)
- One Bird on a Wire (2009)
- The Finger & the Moon (2013)
- Roger Lion (2015) (with Joe Pernice, as Roger Lion)

=== EPs ===
- Daylight (2009)
- Two Africans and a Jew EP Vol. 1 (2010) (with M.anifest and Krukid, as A.R.M.)

=== Singles ===
- "Treadin'" (2013) (with Grynch)

=== Productions ===
- Macklemore - "White Privilege", "Claiming the City", "Inhale Deep", "I Say Hey", "The Magic", "Love Song", "Remember High School", "Contradiction", and "My Language" from The Language of My World (2005)
- M.anifest - "Born Free", "How I Used to Be", "Hubris", "Just Like a Lion", and "Ghana, 52" from The Birds & the Beats (2009)
- Prometheus Brown & Bambu - "Rashida Jones" from Walk into a Bar (2011)
- Onry Ozzborn - "The Getaway Car" and "Limbo Thus Purgatory" from Hold On for Dear Life (2011)
- Grieves - "Light Speed", "Bloody Poetry", "Falling from You", "Tragic", "Boogie Man", "No Matter What", "Vice Grip", "Speak Easy", "Prize Fighter", and "Against the Bottom" from Together/Apart (2011)
- Luckyiam - "Epiphany" from Time to Get Lucky (2012)
- Sol - "The Rundown" and "Budo's Interlude" from Yours Truly (2012)
- Time - "Auto Bio" from Newstalgia (2013)
- The MC Type - "The Ex Laws" from Bad Tattoos Volume 2 (2013)
- Griff J - "Better Late", "To Each Their Own", "Chase What You Want", "Burning Out", and "Home" from After the Starting Gun (2013)
- Dessa - "Warsaw (Budo Remix)" from Parts of Speech, Re-Edited (2014)
- Macklemore - "Glorious", "Marmalade", "Willy Wonka", "Intentions", "Good Old Days", "Levitate", "Firebreather", "Ten Million", "Church", and "Excavate" from Gemini (2017)
- Doja Cat - "Candy" from Amala (2018)
