= Music of Pennsylvania =

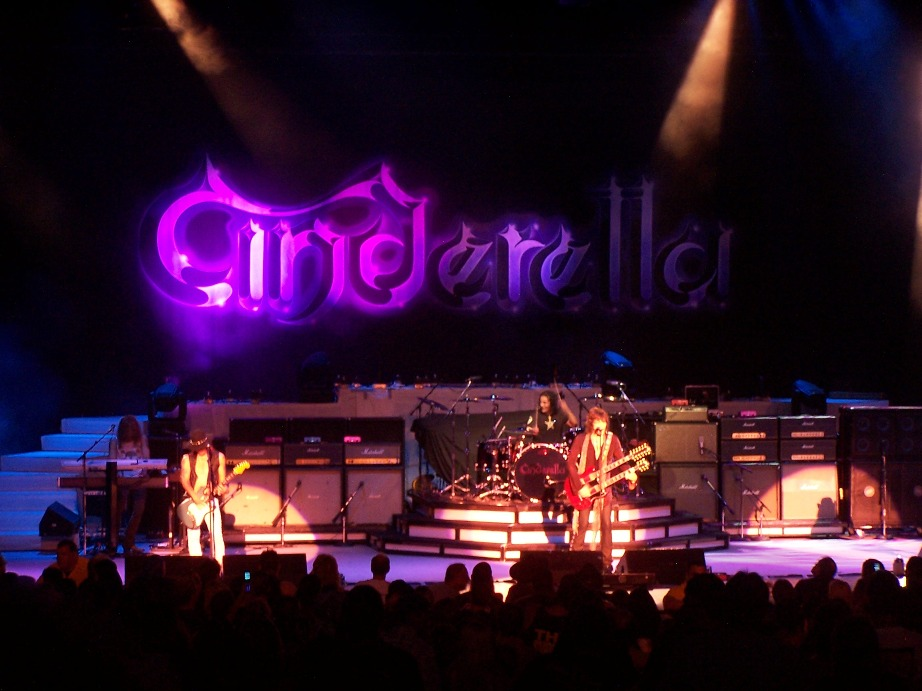
Rock band Poison from Mechanicsburg, whose song "Every Rose Has Its Thorn", released in 1988, was a number one hit

The Music of Pennsylvania dates from the pre-colonial-era through the 21st century. During this time, Pennsylvania has been the birthplace for some of the most prominent musicians of their respective eras and the introduction of entire new genres of music to the nation and world.

The Philly sound of the 1970s is soul music that includes notable Pennsylvania performers Gamble and Huff, The O'Jays, The Stylistics, Teddy Pendergrass, Harold Melvin, and The Delfonics, jazz legends like Billie Holiday, Nina Simone, and John Coltrane. Philadelphia gave to the musical world diverse singers, such as Marian Anderson, Mario Lanza, Solomon Burke, Chubby Checker, Dee Dee Sharp, and the trio performing as The Golden Boys, Frankie Avalon, Bobby Rydell, and Fabian Forte, who grew up together in the same Philly neighborhood. Philadelphia was also the birthplace of American Bandstand, and the home of Cameo-Parkway Records and the famed Philadelphia Orchestra.

The tradition of Pennsylvania's history with music pre-dates the American Revolution. Philadelphia became especially renowned for musical development and was the home of the esteemed Alexander Reinagle, John Christopher Moller, Rayner Taylor, and Susannah Haswell Rowson. Reinagle became the most influential figure in Philadelphia's musical life, organizing a number of concerts, organizations and musical events. Francis Hopkinson, a signer of the Declaration of Independence, was a notable composer of the period. One of his compositions, "My Days Have Been So Wondrous Free", is well-remembered as the first art song from the United States (though this is disputed); it is, however, lacking in originality and innovation to set it apart from European compositions.

During the 19th century, Stephen Foster, one of the most popular American songwriter of the century, was born in the Lawrenceville section of Pittsburgh.

Several concert bands formed in the 19th century during the rise in popularity of community bands, including the Allentown Band, based in Allentown, and The Emigsville Band, based in Emigsville.

Pennsylvania musicians and groups include:

== 21st century ==
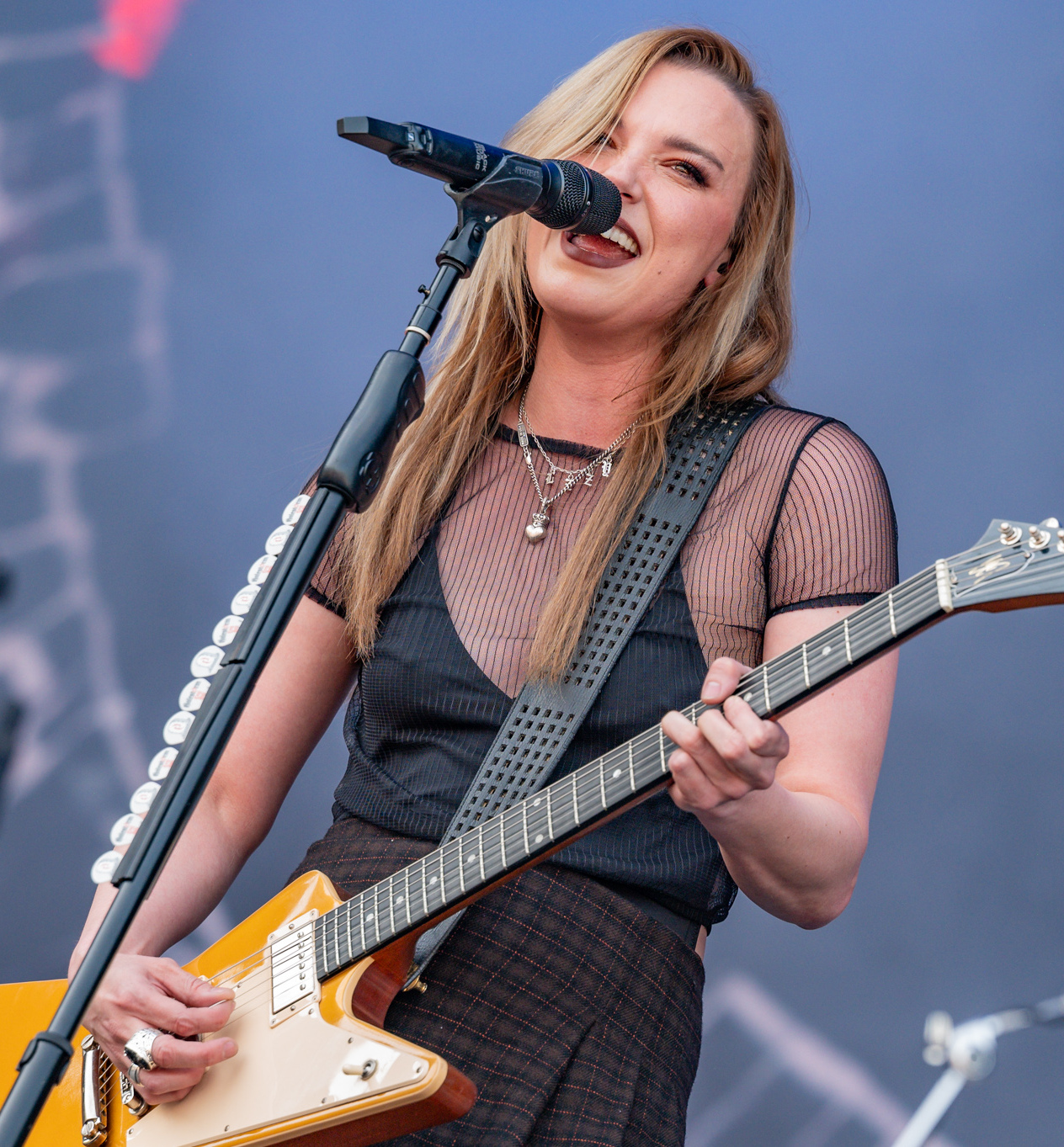
Lizzy Hale, lead singer and rhythm guitarist for Halestorm, a rock band from Red Lion has had six number one Mainstream Rock hits since 2013 with "Freak Like Me" (2013), "Apocalyptic" (2015), "Amen" (2015), "Uncomfortable", "Back from the Dead" (2021), and "The Steeple" (2022)

During the 21st century, major bands and musicians from Pennsylvania have include:

- Amish Outlaws, a cover band from Lancaster
- Breaking Benjamin, a hard rock band from Wilkes-Barre
- CKY, a rock band from West Chester
- Justin Guarini from Doylestown
- Halestorm, a Grammy-winning hard rock band from Red Lion
- Motionless in White, a metalcore band from Scranton
- Christina Perri, a singer-songwriter from Philadelphia, and her older brother, Nick Perri, former lead guitarist Shinedown and Silvertide who currently plays in SINAI
- P!nk, a rock and popular musician from Doylestown, who has had four #1 Hot 100 hits, including "Raise Your Glass"
- Taylor Swift, a popular and country musician from Wyomissing
- The War on Drugs, an indie-rock band from Philadelphia

== 20th century ==
=== 1990s ===
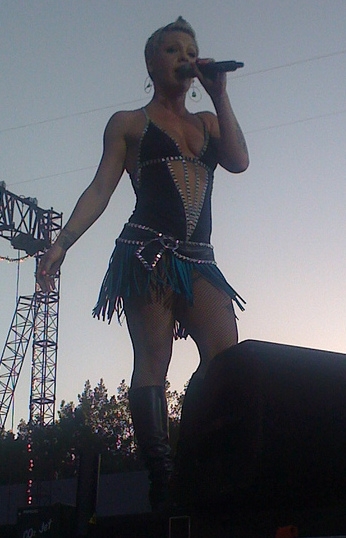
Pink, an American pop singer from Doylestown, launched her music career in 1995.

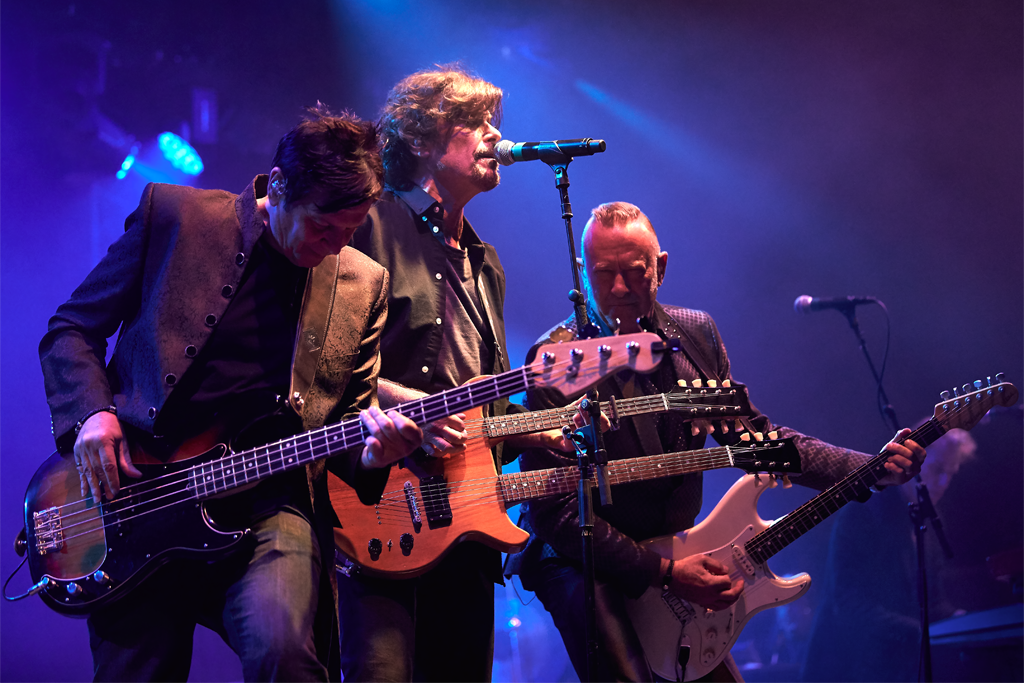
The Hooters, a rock band formed in Philadelphia in 1980

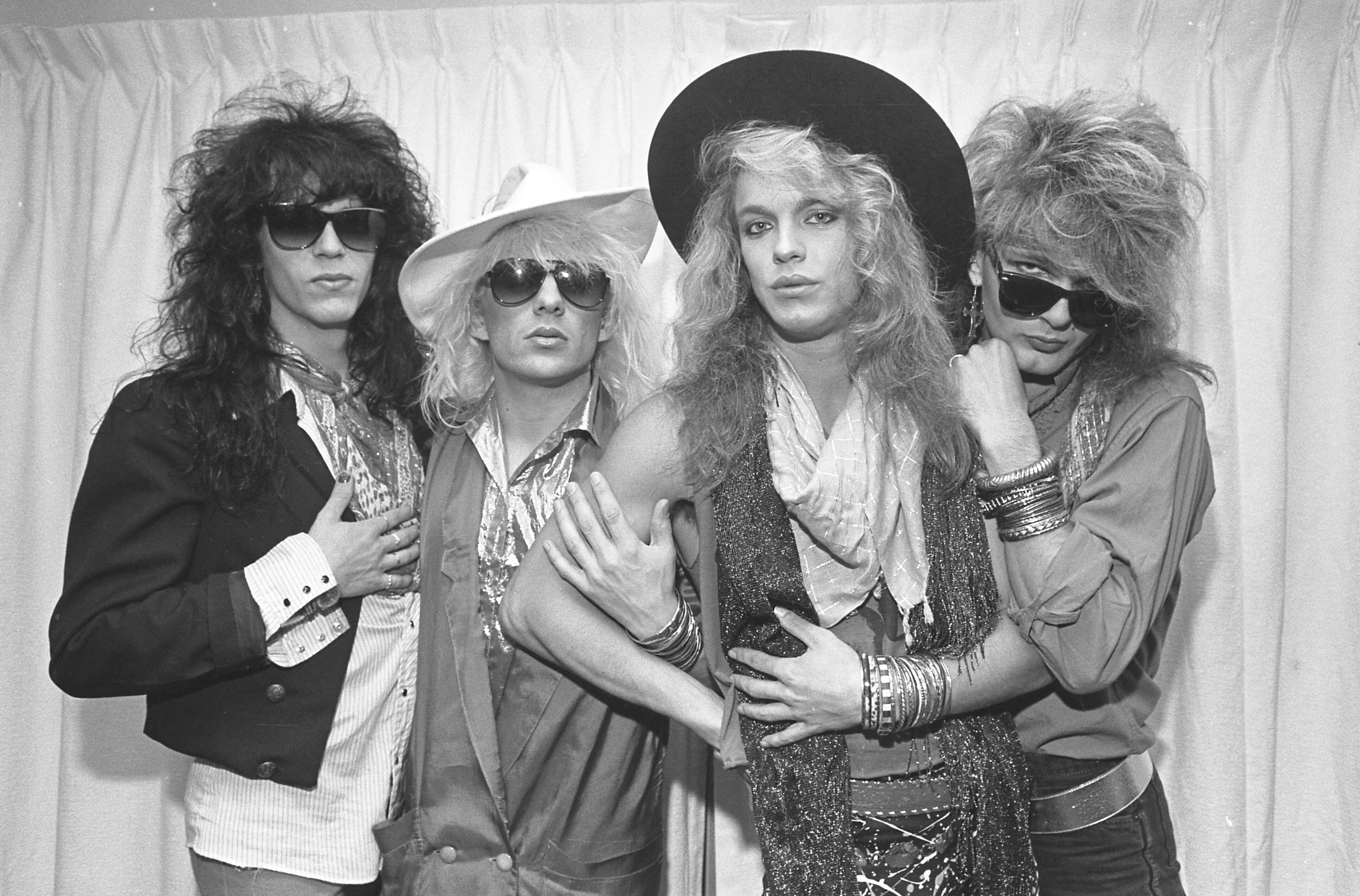
Poison, a glam metal band formed in 1983 in Mechanicsburg

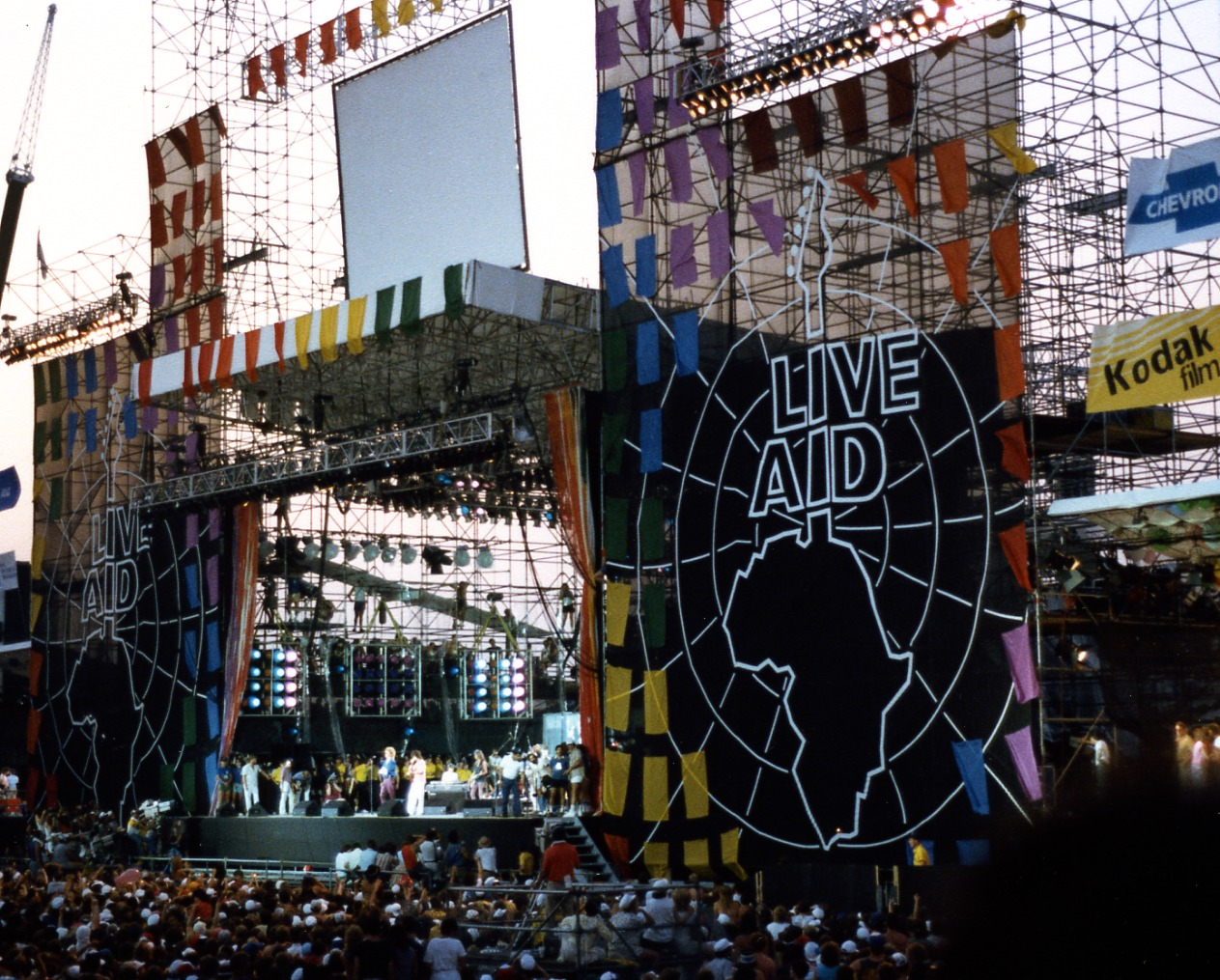
The Live Aid concert at John F. Kennedy Stadium in Philadelphia on July 13, 1985, featured Led Zeppelin, Mick Jagger, Bob Dylan, Crosby, Stills, Nash & Young, Phil Collins, Eric Clapton, Tom Petty and the Heartbreakers, Madonna, Judas Priest, Black Sabbath, and other bands in a concert broadcast on MTV and globally.

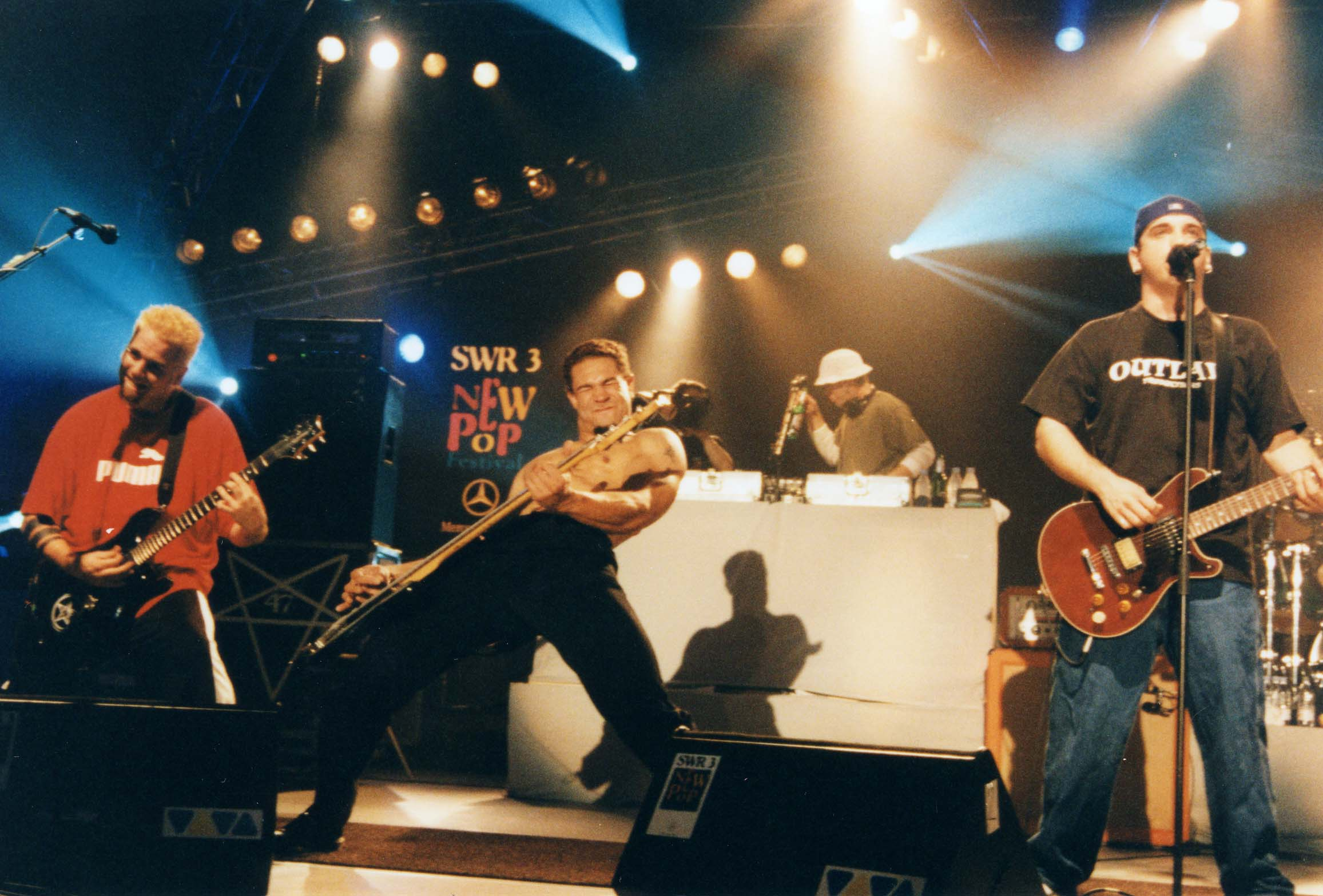
The Bloodhound Gang, an alternative rock band formed in 1988 in Philadelphia

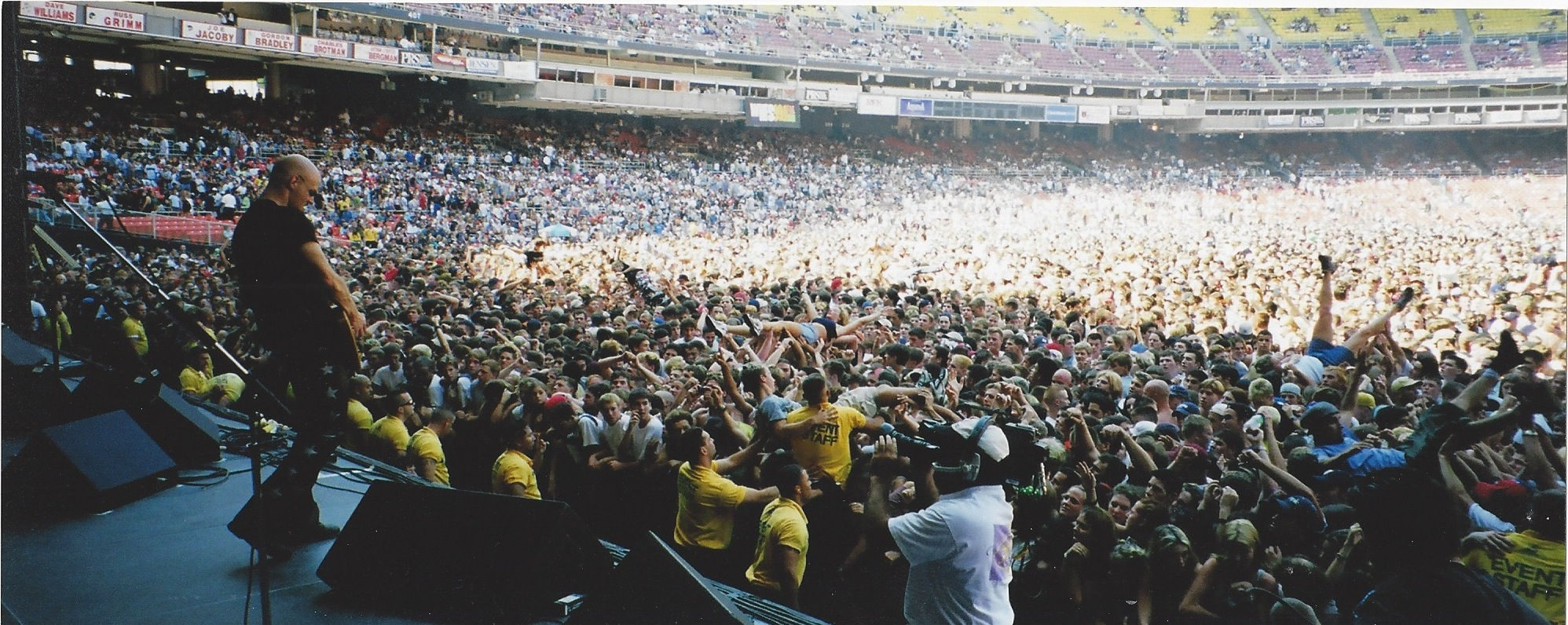
Fuel, a rock band formed in 1989 in Harrisburg

- Nine Inch Nails frontman Trent Reznor is from Mercer, and Nine Inch Nails former drummer and programmer Chris Vrenna is from Erie.
- Live, who achieved commercial success with their second album Throwing Copper, are from York.
- Fuel, despite forming in Henderson, Tennessee, moved to Harrisburg in 1994, where they were eventually signed.
- Acoustic-pop singer Jeffrey Gaines is from Harrisburg.
- The alternative band, The Ocean Blue formed in Hershey.
- Death metal band Incantation are from Johnstown.
- The Clarks, a rock/pop band who achieved major success in the 1990s with the songs "Born too late", "Penny on the floor", "Cigarette", "Better Off", formed at Indiana University of Pennsylvania in Indiana.
- Rusted Root, a jam band who has also had a prolific music career with the songs "Send Me on My Way", "Ecstasy", "Heaven", and "Free my soul", are from Pittsburgh.
- Train lead singer Patrick Monahan from Erie co-wrote the song "Drops of Jupiter", which won two Grammy Awards in 2002.
- G. Love and Special Sauce, who has had a string of successes with songs like "Stepping Stone" and "Recipe", is from Philadelphia.
- Bloodhound Gang, Cinderella, and Britny Fox are both from suburban Philadelphia.
- Ween is from New Hope.
- Christina Aguilera, from suburban Pittsburgh, had five #1 Hot 100 hits, including "Genie in a Bottle" in 1999.

=== 1980s ===
- Hall & Oates are from Philadelphia and attended Temple University. They had six #1 Billboard Hot 100 hits, including "Maneater" in 1982. Todd Rundgren hails from the Philadelphia suburb of Upper Darby Township, which is also home of the world-famous Tower Theater.
- Probably best known for his 1984 hit "I Can Dream About You", Harrisburg native Dan Hartman began his career in the 60's and became a well known performer, songwriter, and producer. Including writing the song "Living in America" for James Brown from the movie Rocky IV.
- The Vogues from the Turtle Creek, near Pittsburgh, scored with the hit "Five O'Clock World" and several other hits. The Jaggerz, named after a Pittsburgh English term for goofing off, had a hit in 1970 with "The Rapper"
- Pittsburgh's Iron City Houserockers, kicked off the decade with immense critical acclaim for their first three albums (Love's So Tough, Have a Good Time But Get Out Alive and Blood On The Bricks). Associated with the heartland rock subgenre and with artists like Bruce Springsteen, Bob Seger, John Mellencamp, and Tom Petty, the Houserockers were regarded by many as both grittier and more kinetic. Although commercial success eluded the group, leader Joe Grushecky and the later incarnation of the band remain popular regional artists. In the Houserockers' wake came a number of other Pittsburgh area bands, including Norman Nardini and the Tigers, whose minor hit "If You Don't Love Me (Someone Will)" put the band briefly on the pop map. More recent entries in the heartland rock scene (sometimes counted as Grushecky protégés) include Bill Toms and Hard Rain and Tom Breiding who have strong local followings.
- Donnie Iris, a former member of The Jaggerz from Ellwood City, had national success in 1980 with "Ah! Leah!", "Love Is Like a Rock", and a string of subsequent minor hits from 1980 to 1984.
- The Stabilizers from Erie were a duo with sessions players for touring. They released a full album with many memorable songs. The song "One Simple Thing" went to number 21. The song "Tyranny" with hard hitting lyrics on how governments control their people had a lot of radio play but failed to chart. The song had two different versions that both got airplay. "Sounds Of The Underground" was never released as a single but was played by many local fans.
- The Cynics were a garage rock band formed in Pittsburgh in 1983. They started their own label, Get Hip Records.
- The Hooters, from Philadelphia, broke into nationwide attention when they became the opening band at Live Aid, where they performed "All You Zombies," which soon after became their first hit single. The album Nervous Night followed with several more major hits like "And We Danced" and "Day By Day" in 1985 and 1986.
- Hair metal band Poison are from Mechanicsburg. They had a #1 Hot 100 hit with "Every Rose Has Its Thorn" in 1988.
- Tammi Terrell ("Ain't No Mountain High Enough") was from Philadelphia and attended the University of Pennsylvania.
- Philly Soul became a staple of 1970s R&B with such Pennsylvania artists as Gamble and Huff, The O'Jays, Teddy Pendergrass, Harold Melvin & the Blue Notes, and The Delfonics. The female-singing group, Labelle, led by Philadelphia's Patti LaBelle, had a #1 Hot 100 hit with "Lady Marmalade" in 1974. This song was covered in 2001 by Christina Aguilera and Pink (singer), both Pennsylvania natives, and by Lil' Kim, which reached #1 on the Billboard Hot 100. In 1972, Billy Paul from Philadelphia had a No. 1 hit with "Me and Mrs. Jones".
- Violinist Papa John Creach, who played with Jefferson Airplane and Jefferson Starship, was born in Beaver Falls.
- In 1979, The Sharks were formed in Lancaster. In 1985, they won an MTV Basement Tapes competition.
- Formed in 1964, Harrisburg-based The Magnificent Men, became the only white act to ever headline New York City's legendary Apollo Theatre and the other major stops on the rhythm and blues Chitlin' Circuit. In 1967, they backed up James Brown as he filled in for an absent headliner. Despite the last minute nature of the arrangement, Brown was floored by the band's dexterity. The following year, in 1968, they became the only outside group to play on a stage with the Motortown Revue at a show in Cleveland.
- Artist Andy Warhol, born in Pittsburgh, produced many record covers, including album art for The Velvet Underground and The Rolling Stones.

=== 1950s ===
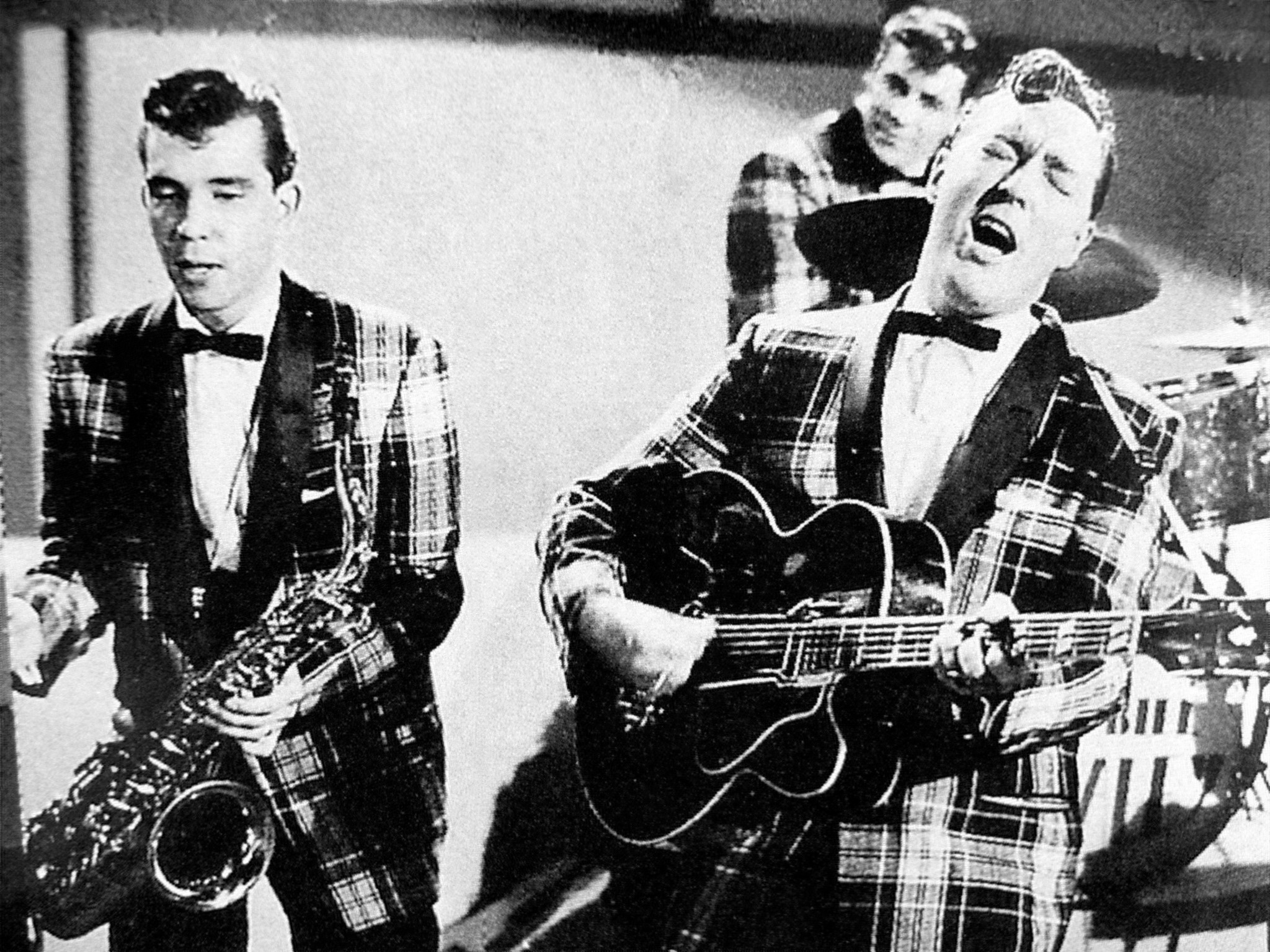
On May 20, 1954, Bill Haley & His Comets from Chester, Pennsylvania released "Rock Around the Clock," the first rock and roll song to reach #1 on the U.S. charts.

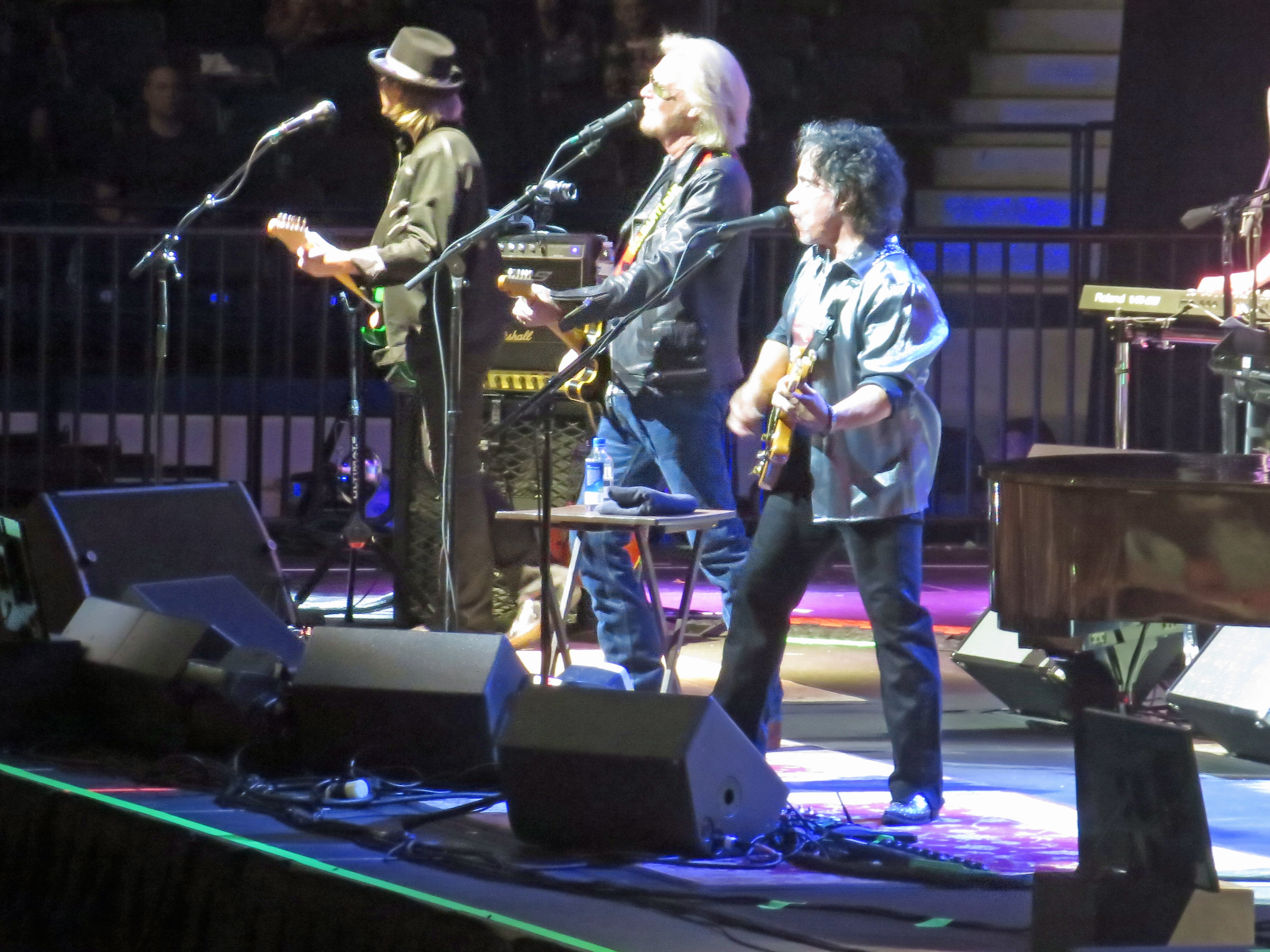
Hall & Oates formed in Philadelphia in 1970, and went on to reach the U.S. Top 40 with 29 of their 33 singles between 1974 and 1991.

- Jimmy Preston, from Chester, released "Rock the Joint" in 1949.
- Lee Andrews & the Hearts were a doo-wop quintet formed in Philadelphia in 1953.
- Bill Haley & His Comets from Chester had a #1 hit with "Rock Around the Clock" in 1955. This was a number-one single in the U.S. and was the first successful rock and roll song.
- The Skyliners were a doo-wop group formed in Pittsburgh in 1958.

== Punk rock ==
- Philadelphia has a flourishing new wave scene that include local acts The Vels and Regressive Aid. Hardcore punk band Electric Love Muffin was from Philadelphia. Later bands like The Dead Milkmen from Philadelphia gained some national success. Notable crust punk group Aus-Rotten is from Pittsburgh. Flag of Democracy from Ambler have released seven albums since 1982 and toured the world. Renowned pop-punk act The Wonder Years are from Landsdale.
- Pittsburgh's Anti-Flag had a local hardcore following. Metalcore bands such as August Burns Red and Texas in July are from the Lancaster area.
- Punk rock band The Menzingers are from Scranton. Folk punk/gypsy punk singer/songwriter Erik Petersen of Mischief Brew is from Philadelphia, and penned the song "Pennsyltucky" in homage to the region.

== Hip hop, R&B, and neo soul ==
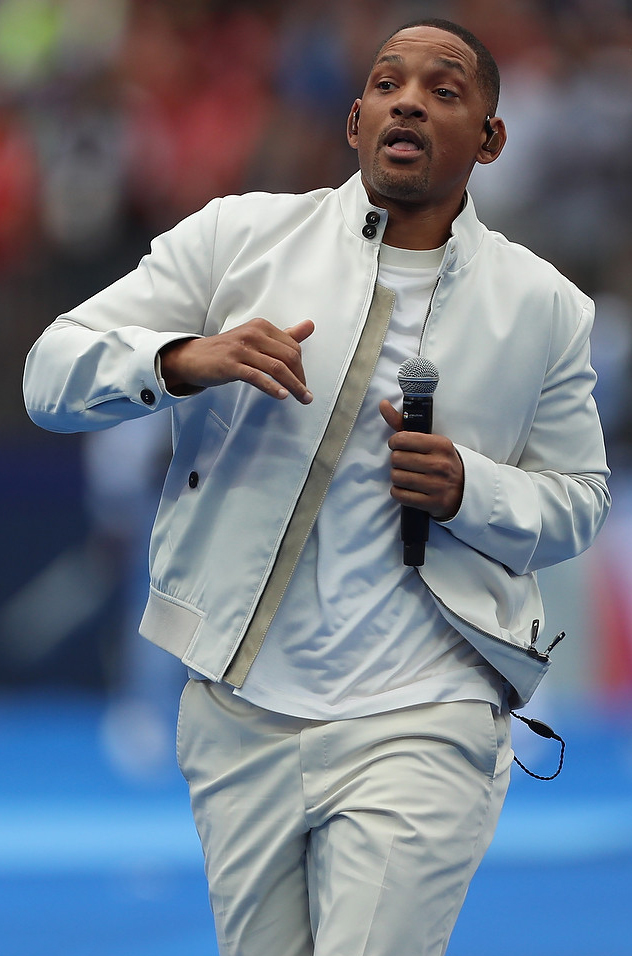
Will Smith, a rapper from West Philadelphia, known for "Gettin' Jiggy wit It", "Wild Wild West", and other songs

Hip hop music, R&B music, and neo soul music are popular elements of entertainment in Pennsylvania, including:

- Will Smith and his hip-hop partnership with Jazzy Jeff, DJ Jazzy Jeff & the Fresh Prince, are from West Philadelphia. Smith had three #1 Hot 100 hits, including "Gettin' Jiggy Wit It" and "Wild Wild West".
- Boyz II Men, the soulful, gospel-tinged, R&B act from the 1990s are also from Philadelphia. They had four #1 Hot 100 hits, including "End of the Road", "I'll Make Love to You", and "On Bended Knee". Their song "Motownphilly" is a tribute to Philadelphia.
- Other 21st century artists from Philadelphia include Jill Scott, The Roots, Eve, Cassidy, Chiddy Bang, Da Youngsta's, Tuff Crew, Beanie Sigel, Freeway, Jedi Mind Tricks, Lil Uzi Vert, Meek Mill (had a #1 album on Billboard 200 in 2018), Ms. Jade, Reef the Lost Cauze, Schoolly D, The High & Mighty, Young Gunz, and 2rare
- Rappers Mac Miller and Wiz Khalifa are from Pittsburgh. Mac Miller had a #1 album on the Billboard 200 with Blue Slide Park in 2011. Khalifa has two #1 Hot 100 hits, "Black and Yellow", which is about growing up in Pittsburgh, and "See You Again".
- Rapper Asher Roth is from Morrisville.

== Blues ==
- Blues singer Gladys Bentley, active in the Harlem Renaissance, was born in Philadelphia.
- Samuel Charters, born in Pittsburgh, was an American music historian, writer, record producer, musician, and poet. He was a widely published author on the subjects of blues and jazz music, including The Country Blues.

== Jazz ==
Pennsylvania has a rich jazz music history, especially in Philadelphia, producing Billie Holiday, Nina Simone, Eddie Lang, and Stan Getz. Others include McCoy Tyner, Joe Venuti, Jimmy Amadie, Robert Chudnick, Jan Savitt, Philly Joe Jones, Reggie Workman, Lee Morgan, Henry Grimes, Ray Bryant, Tommy Bryant, Jimmy Heath, Albert Heath, Specs Wright, Benny Golson, Bobby Timmons, Hasaan Ibn Ali, Rashied Ali, Muhammad Ali, Sonny Fortune, Kenny Barron, Shirley Scott, Luckey Roberts, Jimmy McGriff, Bobby Durham, Stanley Clarke, Rex Stewart, Eric Reed, among many others. Singer Ethel Waters was born in nearby Chester. John Coltrane, Dizzy Gillespie, and Odean Pope, moved to Philadelphia from the Carolinas. Pearl Theatre was a notable jazz venue in Philadelphia.

Jazz musicians from Pittsburgh include pianist/composers Erroll Garner and Ahmad Jamal, bassist Paul Chambers, drummer Art Blakey, pianist Dodo Marmarosa, pianist Walt Harper, trumpeters Roy Eldridge and Tommy Turrentine, saxophonist Stanley Turrentine, hard bop pianist Horace Parlan, singer and bandleader Billy Eckstine, drummer and bandleader Kenny Clarke, double bassist and cellist Ray Brown, double bassist Eddie Safranski, drummer Roger Humphries, drummer Jeff "Tain" Watts, guitarist George Benson, and singer Dakota Staton. Hill District was an important jazz hub from the 1920-50s, including the famous jazz club Crawford Grill.

Composer, arranger, and trombonist Slide Hampton was born in Jeannette. Pianist Sonny Clark was born in Herminie. Singer Maxine Sullivan was born in Homestead. Influential pianist Earl Hines was from Duquesne. Influential jazz organist Jimmy Smith was from Norristown. Tenor saxophonist Joe Thomas was born in Uniontown. Saxophonist Eric Kloss was born in Greenville. Trumpeter Joe Wilder was born in Colwyn. Pianist Keith Jarrett was born in Allentown. Trombonist Lou Blackburn was born in Rankin. Organist/pianist Gene Ludwig was born in Cambria County. Multi-instrumentalist Daniel Carter was born in Wilkinsburg. Trumpeter Randy Brecker and saxophonist Michael Brecker were from Cheltenham. Tommy and Jimmy Dorsey of The Dorsey Brothers were born in Schuylkill County.

The Unforgettable Big Band of York was founded in 2000 in Adams County before moving to York County in 2001.

== Folk ==
Pennsylvania, at the crossroads of Appalachia, the Eastern Seaboard and the Midwest has a rich history of Folk Music sharing influences with many other regions of the nation. Notable artists include Robert Schmertz a prolific songwriter covered by many artists during he 1960s folk revival and after. George Britton a singer with a long career, who took particular interest in reviving the music of his mother's Pennsylvania Dutch ancestors. Buster Red a depression era singer who often wrote about locales in Pennsylvania. Jim Croce arguably one of the most famous folk artist of the 1970s was born and raised in Pennsylvania and worked at WXVU while in college.

== History ==
=== Religious music in the colonial era ===
During the colonial era, the Province of Pennsylvania was home to the Quakers, Moravians, and Lutherans. While the Quakers had few musical traditions, Protestant churches made extensive use of music in worship. J. F. Peter emerged from the Moravian tradition. Conrad Beissel, founder of the Ephrata Cloister, innovated his own system of harmonic theory. Lutherans Johann Sebastian Bach, Dieterich Buxtehude, Johann Pachelbel, and C. F. W. Walther were propagated all over colonial-era Pennsylvania, and especially in present-day Bethlehem, which was the first Lutheran settlement in colonial America and remains a center of Lutheran musical traditions into the 21st century.

==== Ephrata Cloister ====
The Ephrata Cloister (Community of the Solitary) was founded in what is now Lancaster County on the Cocalico River in 1720. This was a group of Seventh Day Baptists led by Peter Miller and Conrad Beissel, who believed in using music as an integral part of worship. Beissel codified the Ephrata Cloister's unique tradition in his Beissel's Dissertation on Harmony; here, he divided notes into two types. These were masters, or notes belonging to the common chord, and servants, or all other notes. Accented syllables in Beissel's works always fell on master notes, leaving servant notes for unaccented syllables. The Ephrata Cloister's hymnbook was large, consisting of more than 1,000 hymns, many of which were accompanied by instruments including the violin. Many of these hymns were published in the 1740s and 1750s.

=== Harmony Society ===
In 1803 and 1804, a group of Christian pietists led by George Rapp arrived from Württemberg, Germany, settled in Harmony, Pennsylvania, and formed the Harmony Society in 1805. The group lived communally, were pacifistic, advocated celibacy, and music was a big part of their lives. The Harmonites (or Harmonists) wrote their own music and even had an orchestra. The Society lasted until 1906, but their final settlement, Old Economy Village in present-day Ambridge, Pennsylvania contains archives with sheet music that is still performed at special community events.

==== Mennonites ====
The Mennonites, followers of Menno Simons, settled in Germantown after emigrating from the German Palatinate and Switzerland between 1683 and 1748. They were led by Willem Rittinghuysen, grandfather of astronomer and mathematician David Rittenhouse. The Mennonites used a hymnbook from Schaffhausen, reprinted in the present-day Germantown section of Philadelphia in 1742 as Der Ausbund Das ist etliche schöne christliche Lieder.

==== Moravian Church ====
Founded in 1457, the Moravian Church originally spread across Moravia, Poland, and Bohemia before persecution forced the remaining faithful to Saxony, where they lived under the protection of Count Nikolaus Ludwig von Zinzendorf. Zinzendorf wrote hymns, and led the Moravians to America, where they began missionary work in Georgia but with little success. They moved on to Pennsylvania, and founded the town of Bethlehem on the banks of the Lehigh River. A group then left for Salem, North Carolina in present-day Winston-Salem, North Carolina.

Both in Salem and Bethlehem, Moravians continued to use music in their ceremonies. Instruments included organs and trombones, and voices were usually in choirs. Players generally played on rooftops for most any occasion, ensuring that they could be heard for great distances. A legend has arisen claiming that a group of Native American warriors approached a Moravian settlement during the French and Indian War, but left after hearing a trombone choir because they believed it to be the voice of their Great Spirit. Moravians were devoted to missionary work, especially among African slaves and Native Americans; in 1763, they published a collection of hymns in the Delaware language.

Moravians also had a tradition of secular art music that included the famed composer Johann Friedrich Peter, who was a German born in Holland who emigrated to Bethlehem in 1770. He brought with him copies of compositions by Joseph Haydn, Johann Christoph Friedrich Bach, Johann Stamitz and C. F. Abel. After living in Bethlehem for a time, Peter moved to Salem, where he founded the Collegium Musicum (in 1786) and collected hundreds of symphonies, anthems and oratorios. It was during this period that Peter also composed a number of well-respected instrumental pieces for two violins, two violas and a cello; he also composed sacred anthems like "It Is a Precious Thing" and arias like "The Lord Is in His Holy Temple".

The Moravian Church continued to produce a number of renowned composers into the 19th century, including John Antes, Johann Christian Bechler, David Moritz Michael, Jeremiah Dencke, Johannes Herbst, and others. Herbst was also a noted collector, whose archives, left to the Salem church after his death, were made public in 1977; these included more than 11,000 pages of content. Salem has gradually become the center for Moravian musical innovation, partially due to the presence of the Moravian Music Foundation.

==== Pietists ====
In 1694, Johannes Kelpius brought a group of German Pietists to the banks of the Wissahickon Creek. These became known as the Hermits or Mystics of the Wissahickon; an 1871 map of Wissahickon Creek notes a Kelpius spring and Hermits Glen. Kelpius was a musician, and he and his followers brought with them instruments that became an integral part of church life. Kelpius was also a composer, and is sometimes called the first Pennsylvanian composer, based on his unproven authorship of several hymns in The Lamenting Voice of the Hidden Love. It is likely that he wrote the text, though the tunes are mostly based on German songs; the English translations in the collection are attributed to Christopher Witt, an Englishman who immigrated and joined the mystics, also building them a pipe organ, said to be the first privately owned organ in North America.

== Classical composers ==
- Early Indianist movement composers from Pennsylvania included Arthur Nevin from Edgeworth and Charles Wakefield Cadman from Johnstown.
- Early composers from Pennsylvania included Samuel Barber, who was born in West Chester, and David Ludwig, who was born in Bucks County.
- Experimental music composer Maryanne Amacher was born in Kane.

== See also ==
- List of people from Pennsylvania
- Music of Philadelphia
- Musikfest
