= Bill Fishman (director) =

American film director

Bill Fishman is an American film director, whose work includes the cult film Tapeheads, starring Tim Robbins and John Cusack, as well as the film version of the TV classic Car 54, Where Are You? He won an award at the 1999 New York International Independent Film & Video Festival and has also directed numerous music videos for such artists as The Ramones, Georgia Satellites, Hank Williams Jr., Suicidal Tendencies and Moloko.

== Filmography ==
Year	Title	Director	Writer	Producer
1988	Tapeheads	Yes	Yes	No
1994	Car 54, Where Are You?	Yes	No	No
1999	Desperate but Not Serious	Yes	No	No
2003	My Dinner with Jimi	Yes	No	No
2021	Hollywood Signs	Yes	No	Yes
2025	Waltzing with Brando	Yes	Yes	Yes

Producer

- Underdogs (2013)
- Forgiveness (2015) (Co-producer)

Executive producer

- Posse (1993)
- Rhino Resurrected (2012)
- Warren (2014)

Music video

- Frickin' A – "Jessie's Girl" (2005)
- Ryan Cabrera – "40 Kinds of Sadness" (2005)
- Every Time I Die – "We'rewolf" (2007)
- Airbourne – "Blonde, Bad and Beautiful" (2010)
- Foxy Shazam – "I Like It" (2012)
- Nickelback – "Trying Not to Love You" (2012)
- The Fray – "Break Your Plans" (2014)
- Counting Crows – "Palisades Park" (2014)
- Counting Crows – "Scarecrow" (2014)
- The Decemberists – "Make You Better" (2014)
- Lucius – "Born Again Teen" (2015)
- Counting Crows – "Butter Miracle, Suite One" (2021)
- Backstreet Boys — "Last Christmas" (2022)
- Arthur Baker and The Backbeat Disciples – "Talk It Over"
- The Blank Theory – "Middle of Nowhere"
- Blessid Union of Souls – "I Wanna Be There"
- Bobby Jimmy and the Critters – "Roaches"
- Brand New Heavies featuring Q-Tip – "Sometimes"
- Brand New Heavies – "You Are the Universe"
- Breakfast Club – "Drive My Car"
- George Clinton – "Do Fries Go with That Shake?"
- Bootsy Collins – "Party on Plastic"
- Dream Theater – "The Enemy Inside"
- Eagles of Death Metal – "Speaking in Tongues"
- Eve 6 – "Victoria"
- Geggy Tah – "Whoever You Are"
- The Georgia Satellites – "Keep Your Hands to Yourself"
- The Georgia Satellites – "Myth of Love"
- The Georgia Satellites – "Shake That Thang"
- Good Charlotte – "Lifestyles of the Rich and Famous"
- Grandmaster Flash – "Style"
- Hank Williams Jr. featuring Van Halen – "My Name Is Bocephus"
- Hank Williams Jr. featuring Kid Rock – "Naked Women and Beer"
- Hank Williams Jr. – "Young Country"
- Infectious Grooves – "Cousin Randy"
- Joyce Irby featuring Doug E. Fresh – "Mr. DJ"
- The Jayhawks – "Big Star"
- King Gordy – "Nightmares (Don't Let Me Fall Asleep)"
- LA Dream Team – "Nursery Rhymes"
- Lamb of God – "Redneck"
- Los Amigos Invisibles – "Sexy"
- Megadeth – "Head Crusher"
- Megadeth – "The Right to Go Insane"
- Moloko – "Fun for Me" (US)
- The Monkees – "Heart and Soul"
- New Edition – "You're Not My Kind of Girl"
- Mojo Nixon and Skid Roper – "619-239-KING"
- The Offspring – "Turning Into You"
- Ramones – "I Wanna Be Sedated"
- Ramones – "Pet Sematary"
- Ramones – "Something to Believe In"
- Saving Jane – "Girl Next Door"
- The Sharks – "Only Time Will Tell"
- Sir Mix-a-Lot – "Big Johnson"/"Carz"
- Suicidal Tendencies – "Institutionalized"
- Suicidal Tendencies – "Possessed to Skate"
- Suicidal Tendencies – "Trip at the Brain"
- Theory of a Deadman – "Hate My Life"
- The Three O'Clock – "Jet Fighter"
- Train – "If it's Love"
- Train – "Save Me, San Francisco"
- Wilco – "Outtasite (Outta Mind)"
- Wilco – "Shot in the Arm"
- Zap Mama featuring Erykah Badu – "Bandy Bandy"
