= Gift Wrapped =

Gift Wrapped may refer to:

- Gift Wrapped (film), 1952 Looney Tunes short film starring Tweety and Sylvester the Cat
- Gift Wrapped (game show), British quiz show
- Gift Wrapped – 20 Songs That Keep on Giving!, 2009 Christmas compilation album
  - Gift Wrapped, Vol. II, 2010 sequel

== See also ==
- Gift wrapping
