= Gonzo (album) =

Studio album by Foxy Shazam
- Released: April 2, 2014
- Genre: Progressive rock, alternative rock
- Length: 30:48
- Label: Self-released
- Producer: Steve Albini

Foxy Shazam chronology
The Church of Rock and Roll (2012)	Gonzo (2014)	Burn (2020)

Professional ratings
Review scores
Source	Rating
Pure Rawk	4/5 stars
SputnikMusic	2.5/5 stars
Under the Gun Review	7/10

Gonzo is the fifth studio album by American rock band Foxy Shazam. The album was announced and self-released for free online downloads on April 2, 2014. A limited quantity of the album was also made available on vinyl records. The band supported Gonzo on their headlining "Gonzo Tour" from May to August 2014 across the United States.

== Recording and production ==
Gonzo was recorded, in its entirety, in a single room in Chicago, Illinois and produced by Steve Albini. The majority of the instrumentals and vocals on the album were recorded in the same room at the same time; only one overdub was used on the entire record. When asked why Foxy Shazam decided to record with Steve Albini, lead singer Eric Nally stated that they chose Albini because, "he's really the only person around nowadays on his level who just records. He doesn't try to stick his hands in any creativeness. He just captures what you're doing, in a really amazing way."

== Track listing ==
All songs written and composed by Foxy Shazam.

No.	Title	Length
1.	"Gonzo"	2:49
2.	"Poem Pathetic"	3:09
3.	"Brutal Truth"	2:54
4.	"Tragic Thrill"	3:36
5.	"Have The Fun"	3:22
6.	"Shoe Box"	3:38
7.	"Don't Give In"	2:57
8.	"In This Life"	4:10
9.	"Story Told"	4:20
Total length:		30:48

== Personnel ==
Foxy Shazam

- Eric Sean Nally - Vocals
- Sky White - Keyboards
- Daisy Caplan - Guitar
- Loren Turner - Bass
- Alex Nauth - Horns/Backing vocals
- Aaron McVeigh - Drums

(Note: Loren and Daisy switched their usual instruments for this album)
