= Car 54, Where Are You? (film) =

1994 film by Bill Fishman

- Theatrical release poster
- Directed by: Bill Fishman
- Screenplay by: Erik Tarloff; Ebbe Roe Smith; Peter McCarthy; Peter Crabbe
- Based on: Car 54, Where Are You? by Nat Hiken
- Produced by: Robert H. Solo
- Starring: David Johansen; John McGinley; Fran Drescher; Nipsey Russell; Rosie O'Donnell; Al Lewis
- Cinematography: Rodney Charters
- Edited by: Alan Balsam; Earl Watson
- Music by: Pray for Rain; Bernie Worrell
- Distributed by: Orion Pictures
- Release date: January 28, 1994
- Running time: 89 minutes
- Country: United States
- Language: English
- Budget: $10.7 million
- Box office: $1.2 million

Car 54, Where Are You? is a 1994 American comedy film directed by Bill Fishman and stars David Johansen and John C. McGinley. It is based on the television series of the same name starring Joe E. Ross and Fred Gwynne that ran from 1961 to 1963.

== Synopsis ==
Partnered in Car 54 are the brash Gunther Toody and the prim, proper Francis Muldoon. Toody and Muldoon's boss, Captain Anderson, assigns them to protect citizen Herbert Hortz, an important witness in the impending trial of local organized crime boss Don Motti. At the same time, the two officers must deal with upheavals in their personal lives, as well as the day-to-day travails of being beat cops.

== Cast ==
- David Johansen as Officer Gunther Toody
- John C. McGinley as Officer Francis Muldoon
- Fran Drescher as Velma Velour
- Nipsey Russell as Police Captain Dave Anderson
- Rosie O'Donnell as Lucille Toody
- Al Lewis as Officer Leo Schnauser
- Daniel Baldwin as Don Motti
- Jeremy Piven as Herbert Hortz
- Tone Loc as Handsome cab driver
- The Ramones as themselves
- Penn and Teller as the Luthers
- Mojo Nixon as Sidewalk Preacher
- Barbara Hamilton as Mrs. Muldoon

Reprising their roles from the original series are Nipsey Russell, whose character Anderson is now a captain, and Al Lewis, whose officer Schnauser now spends his time watching TV re-runs of The Munsters (in which Lewis and Gwynne also starred).

== Production ==
Originally produced in 1990, this was one of several titles from Orion Pictures whose release was substantially delayed due to the company's financial struggles in the early 1990s. The film was intended to be a musical-comedy, but most of the musical numbers were cut following several studio edits and test screenings.

== Reception ==
The film received universally poor reviews. On the review aggregator website Rotten Tomatoes, 0% of 17 critics' reviews are positive, with an average rating of 2.5/10.

The film won a Golden Raspberry Award for Worst Supporting Actress (Rosie O'Donnell), along with Exit to Eden and The Flintstones; and won a Stinkers Bad Movie Awards for Worst Resurrection of a TV Show and was nominated for Worst Picture and Worst Actress (O'Donnell), along with Exit to Eden and The Flintstones.

== Year-end lists ==
- Top 10 worst (not ranked) – Betsy Pickle, Knoxville News-Sentinel
- Top 12 worst (Alphabetically ordered, not ranked) – David Elliott, The San Diego Union-Tribune
