= Gift Wrapped Vol. II =

Gift Wrapped Vol. II - Snowed In!

Compilation album by Various artists
- Released: November 22, 2010
- Genre: Christmas, alternative rock, indie rock, pop
- Length: 69:25
- Label: Warner Bros. Records Inc

Various artists chronology
Gift Wrapped – 20 Songs That Keep on Giving! (2009)	Gift Wrapped Vol. II - Snowed In! (2010)

Gift Wrapped Vol. II - Snowed In! is a Christmas compilation album which was released in the United States on November 22, 2010, to iTunes. The album contained cover versions, live tracks and original songs from artists under the Warner Bros. Records Inc label and its subsidiaries just as the first volume did.

== Track listing ==
1. "Home for Christmas" by Cavo - 4:12
2. "Les trois cloches (feat. Neil Young & Pegi Young)" by Ben Keith - 4:36
3. "Merry Christmas Everybody" by Oasis - 4:22
4. "Christmas Song" by American Bang - 2:41
5. "New York in Wintertime" by Kara DioGuardi and Jason Reeves - 4:21
6. "The Chipmunk Song (Christmas Time Is Here)" by Tegan and Sara - 2:26
7. "December" by Regina Spektor - 2:08
8. "Merry Something to You" by Devo - 1:16
9. "Carol of the Bells" (Instrumental) by David Foster - 2:34
10. "Wonderful Christmastime" by The Ready Set - 4:04
11. "Heaven on Their Minds" by Foxy Shazam - 4:51
12. "Better Days (Acoustic Version)" by The Goo Goo Dolls - 3:31
13. "Baby Come Find Me at Christmas" by Rachael Yamagata - 3:12
14. "Christmas in the City" by Everest - 3:15
15. "Christmas (Baby Please Come Home)" by The Dirt Drifters - 3:03
16. "It Came Upon A Midnight Clear" by The Spill Canvas - 3:35
17. "Last Christmas" by Stardeath and White Dwarfs - 2:26
18. "O Come, O Come Emmanuel" by House of Heroes - 3:59
19. "Little Drummer Boy (Live)" by The Flaming Lips - 5:24
20. "Hanukkah, Oh Chanukkah (Bonus Track)" by Franklin - 1:05
21. "Brooklyn Sleigh Ride (iTunes LP Bed Music) [Bonus Track]" by The Red Elephant - 2:39

=== Video bonus ===
1. "Merry Something to You" by Devo - 1:17
