= The Church of Rock and Roll =

Studio album by Foxy Shazam
- Released: January 24, 2012
- Genres: Hard rock; glam rock
- Length: 36:27
- Label: I.R.S.
- Producer: Justin Hawkins

Foxy Shazam chronology
| Foxy Shazam (2010) | The Church of Rock and Roll (2012) | Gonzo (2014) |

Singles from The Church of Rock and Roll
- 1. "I Like It" Released: October 24, 2011; 2. "Holy Touch" Released: May 17, 2012; 3. "Welcome to the Church of Rock and Roll" Released: August 21, 2012

Professional ratings
Aggregate scores
| Source | Rating |
|---|---|
| Metacritic | 68/100 |
Review scores
| Source | Rating |
| Absolutepunk.net | (80%) |
| Allmusic | 3/5 stars |
| Alternative Press | 4/5 stars |
| BLARE | 4/5 stars |
| Consequence of Sound | 3.5/5 stars |
| Paste Magazine | (72%) |

The Church of Rock and Roll is the fourth studio album by Foxy Shazam. The first single was released on to their Facebook page on October 6, 2011, as a free download.

On December 5, 2011, the track listing, date and cover art for the album was posted. On December 23, 2011, the song "Welcome to the Church of Rock and Roll" was given as a free download to anyone who pre-ordered the album. Rolling Stone began to stream the entire album on their website on 20 January, a few days before the official release date.

== Reception ==
Reviews were mainly positive for the album, with Judah Joseph of the Huffington Post describing the album as "music that sounds better being blared from an old Chevy than out of MacBook speakers." Nicholas Moffitt's review for VZ Magazine says The Church of Rock and Roll is "A spectacle and a rumpus and a purely good time."

== Track listing ==
All songs written and composed by Foxy Shazam.

| No. | Title | Length |
|---|---|---|
| 1. | "Welcome to the Church of Rock and Roll" | 2:18 |
| 2. | "I Like It" | 2:48 |
| 3. | "Holy Touch" | 2:59 |
| 4. | "Last Chance at Love" | 3:17 |
| 5. | "Forever Together" | 3:18 |
| 6. | "(It's) Too Late Baby" | 4:01 |
| 7. | "I Wanna Be Yours" | 2:39 |
| 8. | "Wasted Feelings" | 3:42 |
| 9. | "The Temple" | 3:26 |
| 10. | "The Streets" | 4:36 |
| 11. | "Freedom" | 3:33 |
| Total length: | | 36:27 |

== B-sides ==
- "I'll Be Home Soon Mother Earth" - (only on a limited tour edition 7" vinyl single of I Like It)

== Charts ==
| Chart (2012) | Peak position |
|---|---|
| US Billboard Top 200 (Billboard) | 115 |
| US Rock Albums (Billboard) | 35 |
| US Alternative Albums (Billboard) | 24 |
| US Hard Rock Albums (Billboard) | 12 |
| US Top Heatseekers (Billboard) | 2 |

== Personnel ==
Foxy Shazam

- Eric Nally - Vocals
- Sky White - Keyboards
- Daisy Caplan - Bass
- Loren Turner - Guitar
- Alex Nauth - Horns
- Aaron McVeigh - Drums

Other

- Justin Hawkins - Guitar
