= Foxy Shazam (album) =

Studio album by Foxy Shazam
- Released: April 13, 2010
- Recorded: 2009
- Genre: Glam rock
- Length: 42:38
- Label: Sire
- Producers: Rob Cavallo; John Feldmann

Foxy Shazam chronology
| Introducing (2008) | Foxy Shazam (2010) | The Church of Rock and Roll (2012) |

Singles from Foxy Shazam
- 1. "Wanna-Be Angel" Released: September 2009; 2. "Unstoppable" Released: February 2010

Professional ratings
Review scores
| Source | Rating |
|---|---|
| Absolutepunk.net | (87%) |
| Allmusic | 4/5 stars |
| Alternative Press | 4.5/5 stars |
| The Guardian | 4/5 stars |

Foxy Shazam is the third studio album by the American rock band Foxy Shazam. It was released on April 13, 2010, by Sire Records. The album was originally titled Au Contraire and was their debut major label release. It was produced by John Feldmann except Count Me Out, which was produced by Rob Cavallo.

== Track listing ==
All songs written and composed by Foxy Shazam.

=== Foxy Shazam ===
| No. | Title | Length |
|---|---|---|
| 1. | "Intro / Bombs Away" | 3:20 |
| 2. | "Wanna-Be Angel" | 3:21 |
| 3. | "Count Me Out" | 3:46 |
| 4. | "Bye Bye Symphony" | 4:04 |
| 5. | "Unstoppable" | 3:33 |
| 6. | "Second Floor" | 3:59 |
| 7. | "Oh Lord" | 4:10 |
| 8. | "Connect" | 3:27 |
| 9. | "The Only Way to My Heart..." | 4:43 |
| 10. | "Killin' It" | 3:58 |
| 11. | "Evil Thoughts" | 4:17 |
| Total length: | | 42:38 |

iTunes deluxe edition
| No. | Title | Length |
|---|---|---|
| 12. | "Teenage Demon Baby" | 3:36 |
| 13. | "Some Kind of Love" | 3:07 |
| Total length: | | 49:21 |

Other bonus materials
| No. | Title | Length |
|---|---|---|
| 14. | "Dog In Love with Kitty" | 2:43 |
| 15. | "You and Me" | 4:30 |
| 16. | "Yesterday, Today and Tomorrow" | 3:33 |
| Total length: | | 60:08 |

=== Au Contraire (pre-release) ===
| No. | Title | Length |
|---|---|---|
| 1. | "Intro" | 1:01 |
| 2. | "Bombs Away" | 2:16 |
| 3. | "Wanna-Be Angel" | 3:22 |
| 4. | "Count Me Out" | 3:31 |
| 5. | "Unstoppable" | 3:31 |
| 6. | "Oh Lord" | 4:11 |
| 7. | "Bye Bye Symphony" | 4:09 |
| 8. | "Second Floor" | 3:56 |
| 9. | "Teenage Demon Baby" | 3:31 |
| 10. | "With an Axe" | 4:46 |
| 11. | "Evil Thoughts" | 4:17 |
| 12. | "Killin' It" | 4:10 |
| 13. | "Connect Me" | 3:24 |
| 14. | "Some Kind of Love" | 3:10 |
| 15. | "You and Me" | 4:30 |
| Total length: | | 53:45 |

== B-sides ==
- "Teenage Demon Baby" – 3:36 (iTunes deluxe edition)
- "Some Kind of Love" – 3:07 (iTunes deluxe edition)
- "Dog In Love with Kitty" – 2:43 (Shockhound.com exclusive bonus track)
- "You and Me" – 4:30 (only on early pre-release version of the album)
- "Yesterday, Today and Tomorrow" – 3:33 (only on a limited tour edition 7" vinyl single of Oh Lord)

== Personnel ==
Foxy Shazam

- Eric Sean Nally – Vocals, Lyrics, Creative direction, Design
- Loren Daniel Turner – Guitars
- Sky Vaughn White – Keyboards
- Daisy Caplan – Bass
- Alex Nauth – Horns, Backing vocals
- Aaron McVeigh – Drums

Additional personnel

- Josh Freese – Drums
- John Miceli – Drums (track 3)
- Thomas Pridgen – Drums
- Luke Johnson – Drums (track 5)
- Daniel Morris – Drums
- Roberta Freeman – Backing vocals
- Carmen Carter & The Gang – Backing vocals
- Monique Powell – Backing vocals
- Jason Evigan – Backing vocals
- Amy Feldmann – Backing vocals
- Julian Feldmann – Backing vocals
- Foxy Feldmann – Barking (track 1)
- Justin Hawkins – Guitars
- Steve Jones – Guitars

Production

- John Feldmann – Production (all tracks except track 3), Programming, Engineering, Mixing, Backing vocals, A&R
- Rob Cavallo – Production (track 3)
- Chris Lord-Alge – Mixing
- Neal Avron – Mixing
- Ted Jensen – Mastering
- Erik Ron – Engineering (tracks 1, 2, 4–11), Backing vocals (track 5 and 7)
- Matt Appleton – Engineering, Horns
- Doug McKean – Engineering
- Jon Nickolson – Drum technician
- Steven Poon – Guitar technician
- Frank Maddocks – Creative direction, Design
- Elissa Sherman – Photography
- Tyler Mann – Photography
- Ryan Whalley – A&R
- Craig Aaronson – A&R

== Charts ==
| Chart (2012) | Peak position |
|---|---|
| US Billboard Top 200 (Billboard) | 151 |
| US Rock Albums (Billboard) | 50 |
| US Top Heatseekers (Billboard) | 2 |

== In other media ==
The Cartoon Network live-action series Tower Prep used "Unstoppable" in network promos for the show. The song was also featured in the series's 11th episode "Trust".

The second season of the HBO Max series Peacemaker uses "Oh Lord" as its theme song. Series creator James Gunn had previously used the band's 2012 song "Welcome to the Church of Rock and Roll" in the series premiere.
