= Turning into You =

Single by The Offspring

from the album Days Go By
- Released: September 11, 2012
- Recorded: 2009–2012
- Genre: Punk rock, pop punk
- Length: 3:43
- Label: Columbia
- Songwriter: Dexter Holland
- Producer: Bob Rock

The Offspring singles chronology
"Cruising California (Bumpin' in My Trunk)" (2012)	"Turning into You" (2012)	"Coming for You" (2015)

"Turning into You" is a song by American punk rock band The Offspring. The song impacted radio on September 11, 2012. It is the fourth track and second single (third overall) from the band's ninth studio album, Days Go By (2012) in the U.S. The song peaked at No. 39 on the Billboard Alternative Songs chart with minor airplay. A music video directed by Bill Fishman was produced for the song, but was later cancelled.

== Charts ==
Chart (2012)	peak position
Canada Rock (Billboard)	34
US Rock & Alternative Airplay (Billboard)	46
US Alternative Airplay (Billboard)	39
US Mainstream Rock (Billboard)	24
