= Jeremiah Dencke =

American Moravian organist and composer

Jeremiah Dencke was born October 2, 1725, in Langenbielau, Silesia and died May 28, 1795, in Bethlehem, Pennsylvania. He joined the Moravian Congregation at Gnadenfrei and was called to Moravian center in Herrnhut in 1748, where he became an organist. He emigrated to the American colonies in 1761 on the same ship with the father of Johann and Simon Peter. year. The oldest existing American Moravian art music is a set of seven solos and three duets Dencke composed for the Single Brethren's observance in 1765. It was performed in both Nazareth and Bethlehem, whose diaries use the term Vest Psalm when referring to it.

Jeremiah Dencke was a Moravian and one of the first American composers.

== List of works ==
- Meine Seele erhebet dem Herrn
- Gehet in dem Geruch Seines Brautigams-Namens
- Gesegnet bist du, sein Volk
- Meine Herz dichtet ein feines Lied

== Discography ==
- Flowering Of Vocal Music In America 1767–1823
- Lost Music Of Early America – The Moravians
- Music from 18th-Century Pennsylvania (1976)
- Christmas in Early America (1994)
- Giuseppe Martucci (1995)
- America Sings, Volume I: The Founding Years (1995)
