= Amish Outlaws =

American cover band

The Amish Outlaws
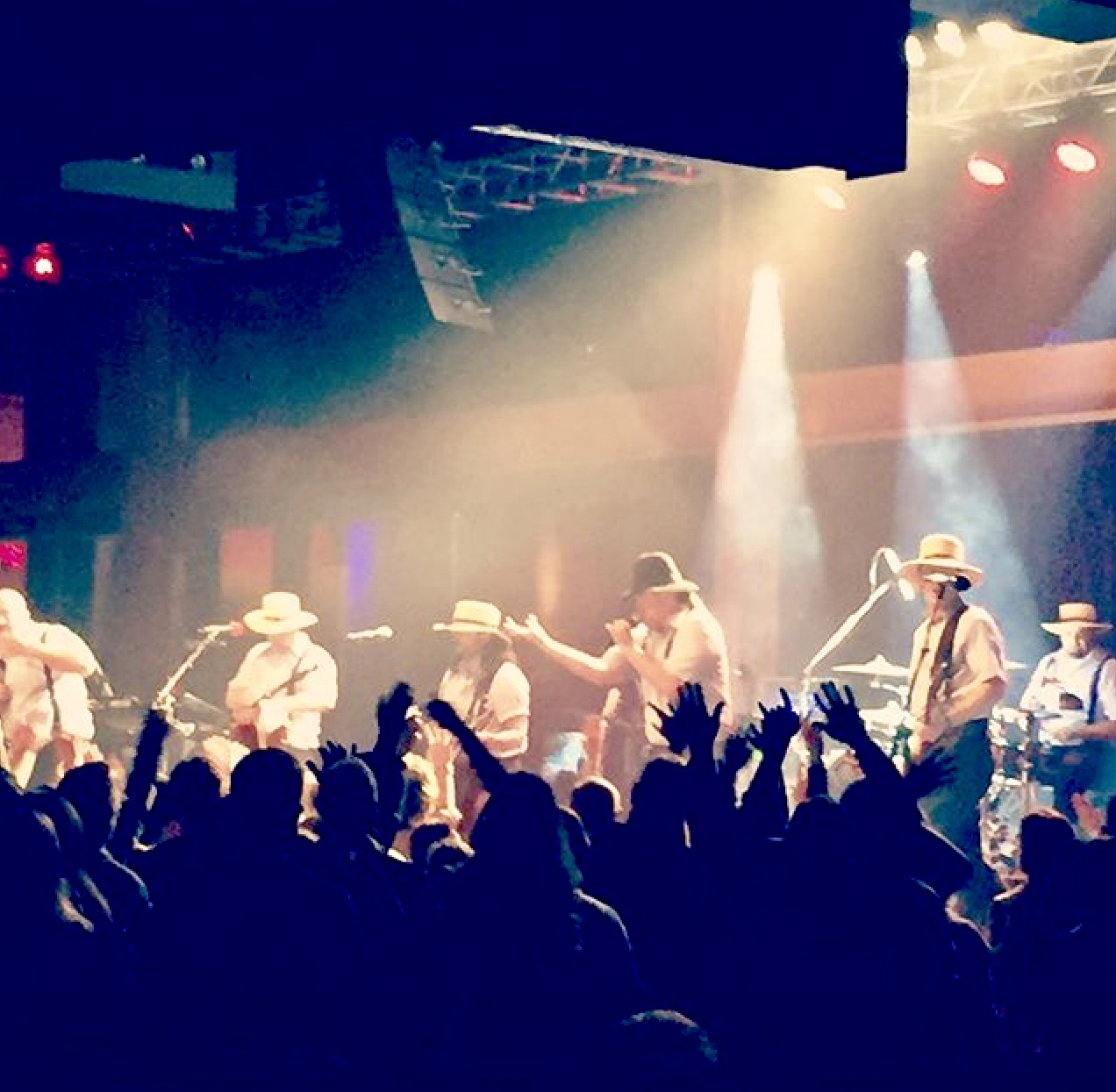
- The Amish Outlaws Live at Musikfest Cafe

Background information
- Origin: Lancaster, Pennsylvania, U.S.
- Genres: Pop; rock; country; reggae; R&B; hip-hop; dance; rap
- Years active: 2002–present
- Members: Amos Def; Big Daddy Abel; Eazy Ezekiel; Snoop Job; Hezekiah X; Jakob the Pipe Player
- Website: amishoutlaws.com

The Amish Outlaws are an American cover band from Lancaster, Pennsylvania. The band was formed in 2002 and is composed of three ex-Amish and three "honorary Amish" musicians.

== Career ==
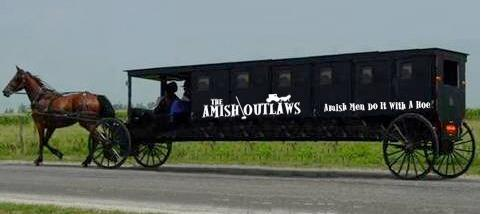
The Amish Outlaws began in 2002. Three of the founding members, Ezekiel, Amos Def, and Hezekiah X moved to New York City after leaving the Amish community. They originally began playing in a band for fun and eventually decided to become The Amish Outlaws to make a living from it. Three of the six members are from the Pennsylvania Dutch Amish community in Lancaster, Pennsylvania, specifically from the Old Order Amish. The band wanted to play popular culture rock music that was not typical of their traditional Amish upbringing. The band plays renditions of songs by contemporary composers and talk about their rumspringa experience as ex-members of the Amish community. They primarily tour the East Coast of the United States. (Rhode Island, Connecticut, Vermont, New Hampshire, Massachusetts, Washington, D.C., New York, New Jersey, Pennsylvania, Delaware, Maryland, West Virginia and Virginia) and have also performed in Ohio, Nevada and Indiana.

They have performed in Las Vegas. at Bally’s Casino and at FreedomFest at Paris Resort. The band has also performed two cruises to Bermuda in 2013 and 2014. The band performs at the annual concert series Musikfest. held in Bethlehem, PA, Party on the Patio in Wilkes-Barre, PA and WingFest in Boalsburg, PA.

== Artistry ==
The band members are known for their movement style where they, in the words of writer Simon J. Bronner, "frenetically jump and gyrate on stage in Amish garb." Band member Ezekiel has stated that they use the clothing as a gimmick, but not in a disrespectful manner. Growing up, the band members did not have much exposure to music outside the Amish community. They sang to Ausbund and heard bits and pieces of music from cars passing through their community. The band performs songs across several genres including pop, rock, rhythm and blues, reggae, dance, country, and heavy metal. The band is constantly changing and updating their musical set list.

== Members ==
=== Current ===
Brother Amos Def plays the keyboard, guitar, banjo, and vocals. He was raised Amish.

Lead vocalist Big Daddy Abel was not raised Amish. He is from New Jersey and he joined the band in 2007. After college, he worked as a school teacher for several years and then as a chemist for several years after that. He also worked as an actor in television shows such as the HBO series Oz, where he portrayed a biker inmate for several seasons. He was also in multiple episodes of Law & Order, Guiding Light, As the World Turns and such movies as School of Rock, Men in Black II, Spider-Man 2, The Guru, and Across the Universe. Big Daddy Abel also composes original music, which can be heard at ReverbNation.com and iTunes. “BDA” is also the author of Open Your Mind, Open This Book: Open Mic, which can be found at Amazon.com (All profits from book sales are donated to research to help find a cure for breast cancer.)

Brother Eazy Ezekiel plays the bass and vocals. He is one of the founders of the band. He was raised in the Amish community until the age of 16. During his rumspringa, Ezekiel moved to New York and earned his GED. He attended Pace University. On hearing the albums Sgt. Pepper's Lonely Hearts Club Band and The Wall, Ezekiel reported that "hearing those two albums for the first time really got me into music." He stated that he still goes back to visit his family at home in Lancaster, Pennsylvania, where he is not shunned because he has not been baptized yet. Some of his brothers have been to a performance of the band, but the rest of his family has not.

Brother Snoop Job is a guitarist and vocalist He was not raised Amish.

Brother Hezekiah X is a lead on vocals. He grew up near Reading, Pennsylvania. He has one brother and one sister. He has stated that some of his family have left the Amish community. The Atlantic City Weekly reported that Hezekiah "had been fantasizing about performing music since he was young, took that big chance leaving family, friends and a way of life behind and he couldn't be happier about it."

Brother Jakob the Pipe Player is a drummer. He was not raised Amish. Jakob joined the band after meeting the members through a mutual friend.

=== Past ===
Brother Ishmael L Cool J was a guitarist for the band.

== Criticism ==
Authors Donald Kraybill, Karen Johnson-Weiner, and Steven Nolt wrote in their book, The Amish, that some youth members of the community rebel and participate in "activities that are offensive to their birthright culture." They cite The Amish Outlaws as an example.

== See also ==
- Music of Pennsylvania
