= Cruising California (Bumpin' in My Trunk) =

Single by the Offspring

from the album Days Go By
- Released: April 30, 2012
- Recorded: 2009–2012
- Genre: Dance-rock
- Length: 3:31
- Label: Columbia
- Songwriter: Dexter Holland
- Producer: Bob Rock

The Offspring singles chronology
"Days Go By" (2012)	"Cruising California (Bumpin' in My Trunk)" (2012)	"Turning into You" (2012)

"Cruising California (Bumpin' in My Trunk)" is a song by American punk rock band the Offspring. It is featured as the sixth track on the band's ninth studio album, Days Go By (2012), and was released as the first single outside the USA, Japan and Canada on April 30. The single cover for the song features the band's Fire Skull mascot, which is the first time it has been used since 2005's Greatest Hits. The song and its video satirizes the mainstream pop music industry. It received polarized reviews from fans and critics, with negative reviewers panning the lyrics and music, while the positive reviews noted its intended satire and compared it to The Offspring's earlier song "Pretty Fly (for a White Guy)". The Offspring commented that they wanted to write a light-hearted joke song as a relief from dealing with more serious themes on Days Go By.

== Lyrics and development ==
Dexter Holland:

As I was writing this record, I realized I was writing some heavier songs, and they were a bit serious. Having some fun songs has always been a part of our band. I thought, 'I should write a couple of songs that are a little more fun and on the lighter side'. Towards the end of the album, I wrote 'Cruising California.' It's about what it'd be like if I was driving down the beach in my hometown on a nice sunny day in Southern California. I live in Huntington Beach so I thought that's what I should write about. My hometown is great, and there's a lot of fun reflected in the song. At the same time, there are some shady and seedy parts. I tried to put both of them in the lyrics. It's a great place, but there's a dark underbelly as well. Huntington Beach had some of the biggest riots in the '80s and '90s so that side of the place always existed. At the end of the day, I want people to know it's a fun, summer song. Bob told me to write about Huntington. It seems weird to write about your hometown-like you're bragging or something. He said people in the rest of the world have a different perception of California. It's like a dream place. It might be where you live, but others don't see it the way you do. You've got to have fun. It's also a good way to cope. There's a lot of silly stuff out there, and it's good to laugh and have fun with it.

Noodles:

It's a silly and fun song. Some of the tracks are more serious and require more thought from the listener. This is about shaking your ass. I call these kinds of songs 'ear worms.' They stay stuck in your head and wriggle around for a few days. I wanted to call it 'Caboose.' That would've worked too.

== Music video ==
The music video premiered on the band's YouTube page on June 8, two weeks before Days Go By was released into stores. The video, shot in the band's hometown of Huntington Beach, California, features an unsuspecting family being pulled aboard a party bus where Dexter Holland, Noodles and the crew are living it up inside.

== Personnel ==
=== The Offspring ===
- Dexter Holland – vocals, guitar
- Greg K. – bass
- Noodles – guitar

=== Additional musicians ===
- Josh Freese – drums
- Jamie Edwards – keyboards
- Dani and Lizzy – additional vocals

=== Technical ===
- Bob Rock – engineer, mixer, producer
- Eric Helmkamp – engineer
- Ted Jensen – mastering engineer at Sterling Sound

== Charts ==
Chart (2012)	Peak position
Australia (ARIA)	70
CIS Airplay (TopHit)	192
Japan Hot 100 (Billboard)	6
