= Days Go By (The Offspring album) =

Studio album by the Offspring
- Released: June 26, 2012
- Recorded: June 2009 – March 2012
- Studios: D-13 (Huntington Beach); Plantation (Haiku); Henson Recording (Hollywood); Record Plant (Los Angeles); Paramount (Los Angeles); The Warehouse (Vancouver)
- Genres: Punk rock; pop-punk
- Length: 42:50
- Label: Columbia
- Producer: Bob Rock

The Offspring chronology
Happy Hour! (2010)	Days Go By (2012)	Summer Nationals (2014)

The Offspring studio chronology
Rise and Fall, Rage and Grace (2008)	Days Go By (2012)	Let the Bad Times Roll (2021)

Singles from Days Go By
- 1. "Days Go By" Released: April 27, 2012; 2. "Cruising California (Bumpin' in My Trunk)" Released: April 30, 2012; 3. "Turning into You" Released: October 14, 2012

Days Go By is the ninth studio album by American rock band the Offspring, released on June 26, 2012, by Columbia Records as the band's final album on the label. Produced by Bob Rock, it was the band's first album to feature drummer Pete Parada, who played on four songs and joined a year prior to the release of their previous album Rise and Fall, Rage and Grace (2008), and their last album to feature bassist Greg K. before he was fired from the band in 2018. The band commenced work on Days Go By in 2009, with plans to release it in 2010. However, its release was pushed back several times while The Offspring continued touring and writing new material. The writing and recording process spanned three years and six recording studios (four in California, one in Hawaii and one in Canada) and was finished in March 2012. The Offspring re-recorded "Dirty Magic", from their 1992 album, Ignition, where it serves as Days Go By's ninth track.

Days Go By's lead single and title track was premiered on radio stations on April 27, 2012, and was released to digital outlets. "Cruising California (Bumpin' in My Trunk)" was the first single from the album worldwide (except for the United States, Canada, Germany, Austria and Switzerland), and was released on April 30, 2012. The album debuted at No. 12 on the Billboard 200 with first week sales of 24,000 in North America.

== Background and recording ==
While touring in support of Rise and Fall, Rage and Grace, The Offspring began to write new material in 2009 for what would become Days Go By. In a May 2009 interview, Noodles revealed that frontman Dexter Holland had been working with producer Bob Rock, and mentioned that the album would include songs that did not appear on Rise and Fall, Rage and Grace. A month later, Holland told OC Register that he wanted to try not to have the ninth Offspring record take as long as Rise and Fall, Rage and Grace. In regards to the album, Holland told Rolling Stone that the band had talked about working with producer Rock again and planned to have the new album out sometime in 2010. Also in June 2009, Noodles told the Edmonton Sun that the Offspring were planning to begin recording in the fall, but did not "have any songs yet. Maybe a couple of demos here and there. But we're looking at old songs and seeing if we could flesh those out." On February 18, 2010, The Offspring posted a link to the "Offspring Studio Cam", which featured images and footages of the band showcasing the writing and recording of their ninth album. They took a break from recording in order to join 311 on their summer 2010 Unity Tour. During that tour, they debuted a new song, titled "You Will Find a Way", at The Joint at Hard Rock Hotel, Las Vegas on June 18, 2010.

On May 3, 2010, Holland posted an update on the new album on the message board of the official Offspring website saying that the band was "working on a batch of songs. They're all in different stages, some are just started and some are nearly finished". He also revealed that the band had been in the studio working on the album "every day for the next two weeks...we're going to try to get something new finished and ready to play live on tour this summer." Holland also revealed they have been working on a new song called "It's All Good", although he was uncertain if it was going to appear on the album. On October 4, Holland posted a message on the band's Twitter, saying "good to be back in the studio". On December 20, The Offspring stated on their Twitter that they had spent the last 2 weeks in the studio and they would continue recording their new album after the holidays for 2011 release. Holland and Noodles mentioned in the Happy New Year Podcast that they had been working on a set of 12 or 13 songs. Talking about when the new album would be finished in the same podcast, Dexter said, "We don't know. It could be done tomorrow, but it won't be finished and it won't be good yet", although he later said that his new year's resolution was that he hoped that it would be finished by March.

In April 2011, Noodles stated in another podcast that the new album would likely be finished before their summer tour. He explained, "We have a whole consumer panel who test our songs and they are all five and we all get feedback from them. I think the new record is going great. We're not finished yet but we've looked at the whole of what we have and I'm really stoked as there is some great stuff there. There's still a lot to be done but we hope to finish it up really quickly and I think we will as we are seeing the light at the end of the tunnel." The band also said they were working on "12 or 13" new songs. On the August 2, 2011 podcast, Holland jokingly said that the band had "been totally fuckin' off and not working on the record." He added, "We've been in the studio everyday up until just a few days ago. We're taking a little break because I need to write some lyrics...I'd say we have a good chunk of the music recorded...we've got 12 songs we like and I think all the drums are done, we've got a lot of guitars...it's just getting the vocals together. We're very very close." While Noodles was uncertain whether the new album would be released in 2011, he said that it was "definitely not gonna be a Chinese Democracy situation". He also said the band was "getting close to the end" and seeing "the light at the end of the tunnel", and that they are "not gonna go in and scrap everything and re-write" the songs. In an interview at the I-Day Festival in Bologna, Italy, which took place September 4, 2011, Noodles said that The Offspring's new album would not be released until 2012, and they "should have it done by the end of this year you know, and then really next year we'll start moving on working on the artwork and all that."

On September 14, 2011, The Offspring announced on their Facebook page that they were expected to "be back in the studio in about a week" to restart recording their new album, which they hoped would be finished within the next two or three months. On the same day, the band announced that they would tour to support the album in 2012. The Offspring announced on October 4 that they were back in the studio. On January 5, 2012, Noodles mentioned on Twitter that he was hoping the new Offspring album would be finished by the end of the month; however Dexter said that album would be completed by the end of February. On March 24, Holland announced that the album was finished.

On April 27, 2012, the same day "Days Go By" was premiered on KROQ, The Offspring revealed to Kevin and Bean that the album would be released on June 26, 2012. On the following day, the band announced on Twitter that they were filming a video for "Days Go By". On April 30, 2012, The Offspring released "Cruising California (Bumpin' in My Trunk)" as the first single for the album in other countries and released a music video on June 8, 2012.

On June 19, 2012, a week before its release, the band announced via Twitter that Days Go By was streaming on Rolling Stone magazine's website.

The album spawned three singles and three videos. Both "Days Go By" and "Cruising California (Bumpin' in My Trunk)" had music videos and single releases. Although "Turning into You" was released as a radio single, there was no video for it. However, a combined music video was released for both "Dividing by Zero" and "Slim Pickens Does the Right Thing and Rides the Bomb to Hell."

== Reception and sales ==
Professional ratings
Aggregate scores
Source	Rating
Metacritic	51/100
Review scores
Source	Rating
AllMusic	2.5/5 stars
Consequence of Sound	2/5 stars
Entertainment Weekly	B−
Kerrang!	4/5 stars
Now	2/5 stars
PopMatters	5/10
Q	2/5 stars
Rolling Stone	2/5 stars
Spin	4/10
Sputnikmusic	3.5/5

Days Go By received generally mixed reviews from music critics, with critics stating there was a heavy-sounding Foo Fighters feel to the title track. At Metacritic, which assigns a weighted mean rating out of 100 to reviews from mainstream critics, the album received an average score of 51 based on 13 reviews AllMusic reviewer Gregory Heaney gave the album two-and-a-half out of 5 stars, stating that it is "more for fans who have been with the band for a while than those just tuning in, and while die-hard Offspring followers will be able to see the shift in the band's sound as part of a logical progression, new listeners would be better served by checking out some of their earlier, more urgent work." Brazilian website Whiplash.net gave a very favorable review, giving the album a score 8 out of 10 and noting that: "The album is not flawless, but the guitars are back, there are some "whooas" and that sounds like they are returning to a long lost path."

Days Go By peaked at number twelve on the U.S. Billboard 200, selling 24,000 copies in its first week of release.

== Track listing ==
All tracks are written by Dexter Holland.

No.	Title	Length
1.	"The Future Is Now"	4:08
2.	"Secrets from the Underground"	3:09
3.	"Days Go By"	4:01
4.	"Turning into You"	3:41
5.	"Hurting as One"	2:49
6.	"Cruising California (Bumpin' in My Trunk)"	3:30
7.	"All I Have Left Is You"	5:18
8.	"OC Guns"	4:07
9.	"Dirty Magic" (re-recorded version of the group's song from their 1992 album Ignition)	4:00
10.	"I Wanna Secret Family (with You)"	3:01
11.	"Dividing by Zero"	2:22
12.	"Slim Pickens Does the Right Thing and Rides the Bomb to Hell" (title is a reference to the 1964 film Dr. Strangelove)	2:36
Total length:		42:42

== Charts ==
Chart performance for Days Go By
Chart (2012)	Peak position
Australian Albums (ARIA)	7
Austrian Albums (Ö3 Austria)	6
Belgian Albums (Ultratop Flanders)	95
Belgian Albums (Ultratop Wallonia)	44
Canadian Albums (Billboard)	4
Czech Albums Chart	12
Dutch Albums (Album Top 100)	56
Finnish Albums (Suomen virallinen lista)	34
French Albums (SNEP)	18
German Albums (Offizielle Top 100)	5
Italian Albums (FIMI)	23
Japanese Albums (Oricon)	7
New Zealand Albums (RMNZ)	17
Portuguese Albums (AFP)	24
Scottish Albums (Official Charts)	42
Spanish Albums (Promusicae)	22
Swedish Albums (Sverigetopplistan)	57
Swiss Albums (Schweizer Hitparade)	8
UK Albums (Official Charts)	43
US Billboard 200	12
US Top Alternative Albums (Billboard)	3
US Top Rock Albums (Billboard)	4

== Personnel ==
The Offspring

- Dexter Holland – vocals, guitar
- Noodles – guitar, backing vocals
- Greg K. – bass, backing vocals
- Pete Parada – drums (4, 9, 11, 12)

Production

- Bob Rock – producer, mixing, engineer
- Eric Helmkamp – engineer
- Steve Masi – guitar tech
- Ted Jensen – mastering

Artwork

- Deadskinboy Design – art direction, design, cover photography
- Associated Press – occupy photograph
- Firebox – illustration
- Charley U. Elmaga – matches photograph

Additional musicians

- Josh Freese – drums (all except 4, 9, 11, 12)
- Todd Morse – backing vocals
- Jamie Edwards – keyboards (1, 3, 6, 7)
- Jon Berry – backing vocals (2)
- Dani and Lizzy Mariachi – additional vocals (6)
- Mariachi Sol de Mexico de Jose Hernandez – Mariachi band (8)
- Carlos Gomez – additional Mariachi guitar (8)
- Ronnie King – keyboards (8)
- DJ Trust – turntables (8)
