= Introducing (Foxy Shazam album) =

Studio album by Foxy Shazam
- Released: January 22, 2008
- Recorded: October 2007–January 2008
- Studios: Bates Cave, Seattle, Washington
- Genres: Alternative rock; post-hardcore; experimental rock; soul
- Length: 33:12
- Labels: Ferret; New Weatherman
- Producers: Casey Bates; Jesse Korman

Foxy Shazam chronology
The Flamingo Trigger (2005)	Introducing (2008)	Foxy Shazam (2010)

Professional ratings
Review scores
Source	Rating
Absolutepunk.net	(84%)
AllMusic	4/5 stars
Alternative Press	3/5 stars
Drowned in Sound	5/10
MammothPress.com	7/10 stars
Paper Thin Walls	7/10 stars
Pop Matters	3/10

Introducing is the second studio album by the American rock band Foxy Shazam. It was released on January 22, 2008, by Ferret Music and New Weatherman. In spite of the name, Introducing was not the first album the band created. Recording for the album began at a Seattle studio in August 2007. The band joined Piermont Management, which was partially owned by Jesse Korman (frontman of The Number Twelve Looks Like You), to produce it along with Casey Bates. Korman is also a featured vocalist on the track "Ghost Animals".

== Track listing ==
All tracks are written by Foxy Shazam.

No.	Title	Length
1.	"Introducing Foxy"	3:18
2.	"The Rocketeer"	2:49
3.	"A Dangerous Man"	3:06
4.	"The Science of Love"	3:04
5.	"A Black Man's Breakfast"	3:30
6.	"It's Hair Smelled Like Bonfire"	2:41
7.	"Red Cape Diver"	4:17
8.	"Yes! Yes! Yes!"	2:55
9.	"Ghost Animals"	3:28
10.	"Cool"	4:12

Japanese bonus tracks
No.	Title	Length
11.	"Born to the Devil"	3:06
12.	"Sky in a Room"	2:12

== Personnel ==
- Eric Sean Nally – vocals
- Loren Daniel Turner – guitars
- Sky Vaughn White – keyboards
- Daisy – bass guitar
- Joseph Allen Halberstadt – drums

Jesse Korman provides additional vocals on "Ghost Animals".
