= Days Go By (The Offspring song) =

Single by the Offspring

from the album Days Go By
- Released: April 27, 2012
- Recorded: 2009–2012
- Genre: Alternative rock; pop punk
- Length: 4:01
- Label: Columbia
- Songwriter: Dexter Holland
- Producer: Bob Rock

The Offspring singles chronology
"Half-Truism" (2009)	"Days Go By" (2012)	"Cruising California (Bumpin' in My Trunk)" (2012)

"Days Go By" is a song by the American punk rock band the Offspring, featured as the third track on the band's ninth studio album of the same name and was released as its first single. The song was premiered on the Los Angeles, California rock station KROQ on April 27, 2012. "Days Go By" was released to radio on May 1, 2012; the song was written by frontman Dexter Holland. It peaked at No. 2 on the US Mainstream Rock chart.

== Background ==
"Days Go By" was one of the first songs the Offspring started working on for the Days Go By album, and was almost the last to be completed. "We really kept coming back to it over the course of the record", said frontman/lyricist Dexter Holland. It was originally not going to be on the album, depending on how it was doing next to the other songs as the album was being written. "There are versions on YouTube where the guitar riff is different, the verse is different, the chorus is different-so it's a totally different song now, really. It was kind of toward the end [of recording] when people started listening to it. My friends, my manager started pointing at it, saying, 'That's the one you've got to go with."

== Lyrics ==
Speaking of the lyrics, Holland commented, "It's me observing that people have been going through a shitty time in the last few years, including myself. I just wanted to put some hope out there and say that no matter how bad it is, nobody's going to pick you up. You've got to do it yourself and there is hope and you're going to do it."

== Reception ==
"Days Go By" received positive response. Amy Sciarretto of Loudwire described it as "gimmick-free" and "a bit more contemplative, lyrically and comparatively speaking, as Holland ponders the then and the now. Overall, it has the bouncy rock vibe of a Foo Fighters tune with the added sprinkle of the Offspring's American punk rock flavor." The song received another positive review from Sylvie Lesas of Evigshed, who called it a "cool song, awesome sonic trip through the sounds of 90s and modern rock that rips and doesn't disappoint." Lesas also described it as a "memorable melody, intense distorted guitars and infectious chorus/verses making this song, thrilling enough to whet your appetite for their upcoming album."

== Charts ==
=== Weekly charts ===
Weekly chart performance for "Days Go By"
Chart (2012)	Peak position
Canada Hot 100 (Billboard)	88
Canada Rock (Billboard)	2
Japan Hot 100 (Billboard)	48
US Hot Rock & Alternative Songs (Billboard)	4

=== Year-end charts ===
Year-end chart performance for "Days Go By"
Chart (2012)	Position
US Hot Rock Songs (Billboard)	21

== Personnel ==
=== The Offspring ===
- Dexter Holland – vocals, guitar
- Noodles – guitar
- Greg K. – bass

=== Additional musicians ===
- Josh Freese – drums
- Jamie Edwards - keyboards
