= Foxy Shazam =

American alternative rock band

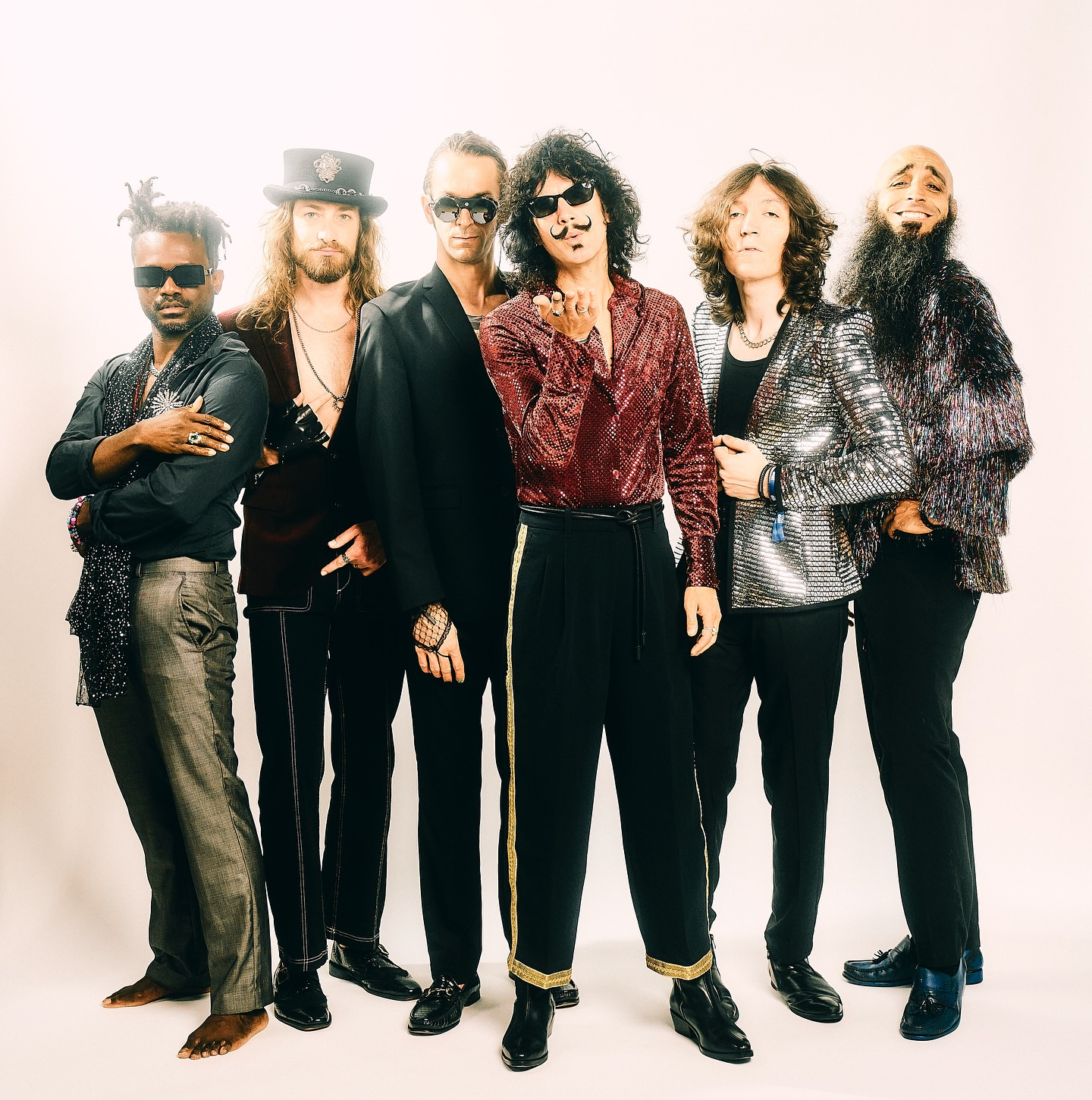
- Foxy Shazam as of August 2025. L-R: Teddy Aitkins, Alex Nauth, Misster Universe, Eric Nally, Devin Williams, Sky White

Background information
- Origin: Cincinnati, Ohio, United States
- Genres: Glam rock; alternative rock; hard rock; pop rock
- Years active: 2004–2014, 2020–present
- Labels: Ferret; Sire; Warner Bros.; I.R.S.; EMI; eeeoooah
- Members: Eric Nally; Schuyler "Sky" White; Alex Nauth; Teddy Aitkins; Misster Universe; Devin Williams
- Past members: Loren Turner; Daisy Caplan; Aaron McVeigh; Joseph Halberstadt; John Sims; Skylyn Ohlenkamp; Baron Walker; Jamison Pack
- Website: www.foxyshazam.com

Foxy Shazam is an American rock band from Cincinnati, Ohio, formed in 2004. As of 2026, the band's lineup consists of lead vocalist Eric Nally, pianist Sky White, trumpeter and backing vocalist Alex Nauth, bassist Misster Universe, guitarist Devin Williams, and drummer Teddy Aitkins. The band released their debut album, The Flamingo Trigger, independently in 2005 before signing with Ferret Music, under which they released their second album, Introducing, in 2008. The following year, the band recorded its first major label record with producer John Feldmann. Foxy Shazam signed with Sire Records and released its self-titled major-label debut in 2010. The band's fourth studio album, The Church of Rock and Roll, was released in January 2012. Gonzo, the band's fifth album, was released April 2, 2014.

They announced in October 2014 they were disbanding for an unknown length of time. The band performed a reunion concert at the Andrew J. Brady Music Center in Cincinnati, Ohio, on February 12, 2022, which sold out immediately. The concert was originally scheduled for April 11, 2020, but was rescheduled due to the COVID-19 pandemic. Since reuniting in 2020, the group has released four albums (Burn, The Heart Behead You, Dark Blue Night, and Animality Opera) through their own eeeoooah label. Their tenth album, Box of Magic, was announced in August 2025 with the release of its lead single "Magic". The album was released on October 6 of the same year.

== Biography ==
=== 1997–2007: Train of Thought and the formation of Foxy Shazam! ===
In 1997, Eric Nally started nu-metal group Train of Thought. After Loren Turner joined the group in 2003, they later released a self-released extended play (EP), which consisted of two songs. In 2004, they decided to change the name of the band to "Foxy Shazam!" due to several members of Train of Thought leaving and a change in sound. On June 15, 2005, the band released their official debut album, titled The Flamingo Trigger. In support of their debut album, the band toured all across the country from 2005 to 2007.

=== 2008–2009: Signing to Ferret Music and Introducing ===
After the band's debut tour, the group announced that they signed a record deal to Ferret Music. On January 22, 2008, they released their second album, titled Introducing. The album was supported by the lead single "A Dangerous Man" and was described as "a smacktastic spazz-core record" in a positive review from The Fader. In 2008, they were named as one of the "100 Bands You Need to Know" by Alternative Press, which led to the band earning spots on tours with bands such as The Darkness, The Strokes, The Sounds, The Fall of Troy, Hole, Portugal. The Man, Tub Ring, The Dear Hunter, Tera Melos, Free Energy, Bad Rabbits, Panic! at the Disco and The Young Veins, to support their second studio release.

=== 2010: Signing to Sire Records and self-titled album ===
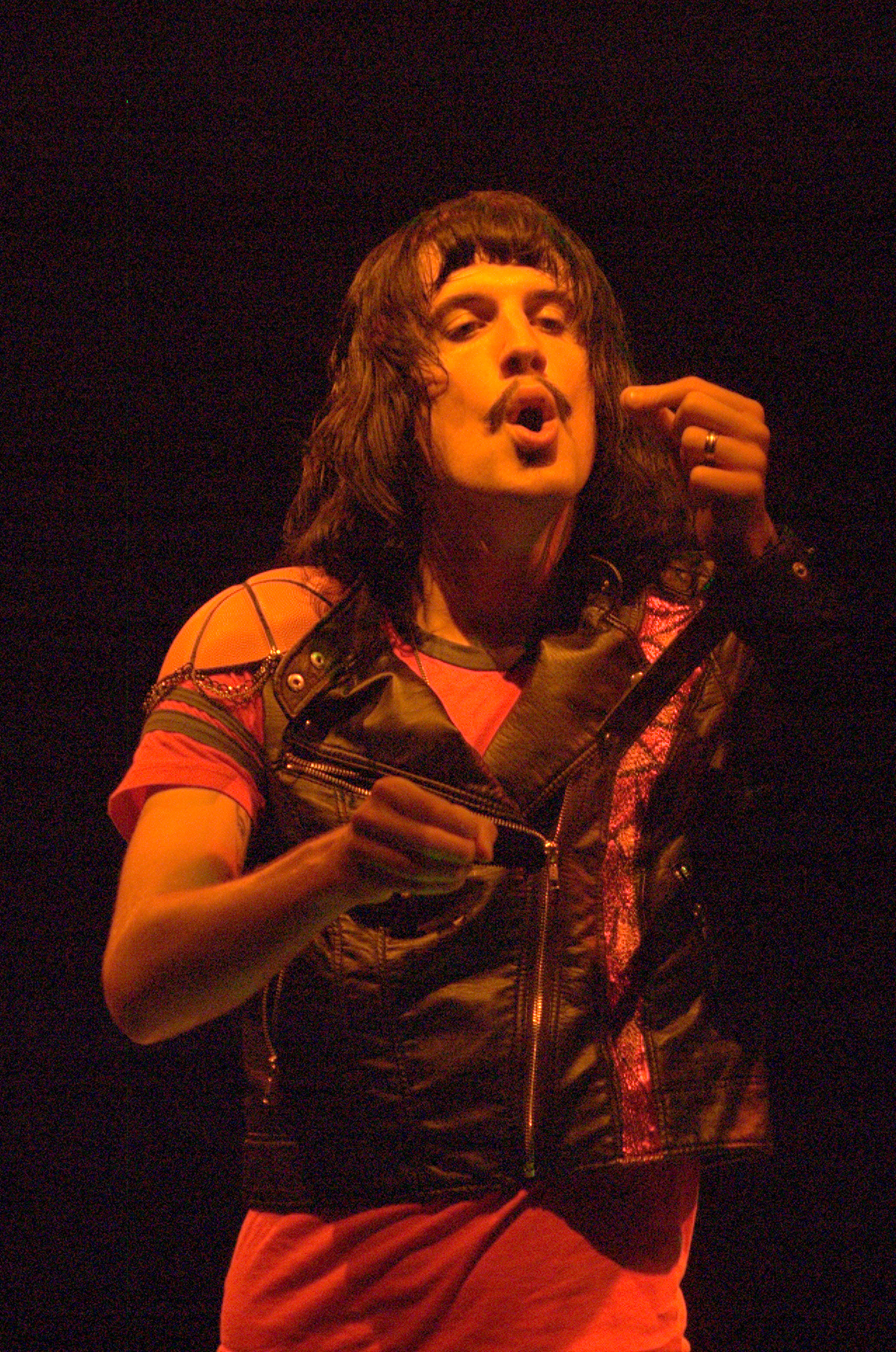
Lead vocalist Eric Nally in 2010

In 2010, Foxy Shazam was included on the Spin list of "Ten Bands You Need To Know". The lead vocalist from the band, Eric Sean Nally wrote songs for Meat Loaf's album Hang Cool, Teddy Bear. The band announced that they signed a deal to Sire Records. On February 7, 2010, their single "Unstoppable" was used in the Super Bowl XLIV telecast as background music for the first half highlights. The track was featured on the NHL 11 video game and it was included on the Cartoon Network's second live-action show Tower Prep as a theme song. The song was also included in a trailer of the movie Your Highness, and the song was featured in a series of the commercials for MLB Network. On April 13, 2010, they released their self-titled third album, Foxy Shazam. The band then performed at Lollapalooza festival. They appeared in many magazines such as Alternative Press and Spin to support the album. The band played a 3-song set on Fuel.tv's The Daily Habit,, a 5-song set on shockhound.com, as well as performing an acoustic 3-song set for Spin Magazine. In July 2010, the band visited the Chicago's JBTV, where they were interviewed and then they performed live and premiered their exclusive version of "Oh, Lord" to the music discovery app, titled Shazam. The band was later named as the spotlight band for the 2011's Warped Tour.

=== 2011–2013: Signing to IRS Records and The Church of Rock and Roll ===
On December 5, 2011, Foxy Shazam announced the title to their fourth album, The Church of Rock and Roll, revealed the album's final track listing, along with a cover artwork and the release date for January 2012. On January 24, 2012, they released the album. It included three singles: "I Like It", "Holy Touch" and "Welcome to the Church of Rock and Roll". After the band toured, serving as the opening act for The Darkness, Foxy Shazam announced that they would be embarking on a headlining tour starting in April 2012. They performed at their hometown Bunbury Music Festival in Cincinnati, OH in July. They then toured as the opening act for Slash on his North American tour dates from September 4 to October 4, 2012.

=== 2014: Gonzo and hiatus ===
On March 12, 2014, it was announced via 96ROCK that the band had completed work on their latest LP and that it would be released in the same month. The album's title was announced and it was indicated to be a concept album. On April 2, 2014, the band released Gonzo online for free through Bandcamp. Gonzo is the band's first self-released album since 2005's The Flamingo Trigger. The band recorded the album together live in one room with producer Steve Albini.

The band released a music video for the single "Tragic Thrill". On October 27, 2014, Foxy Shazam announced on their Facebook page that they were disbanding indefinitely, four days before embarking on the second US leg of their Gonzo tour but intended to get back together at some future date.

In 2015, Eric Nally was featured on Macklemore & Ryan Lewis' song "Downtown", the first single from their upcoming second album. Other band members have remained in Cincinnati and have gone on to have considerable local and regional success since the hiatus began. In 2015 trumpet player Alex Nauth formed The Skulx with ex-members of Cincinnati bands The Killtones and Cadaver Dogs. The band was nominated for a Cincinnati Entertainment Award for New Artist of the Year in late 2015. In late 2014 bassist Daisy Caplan founded Cincinnati-based band Babe Rage. The group disbanded in 2015.

In 2016, Caplan began playing drums for Lung, an experimental rock duo, with electric cellist Kate Wakefield. The band received two Cincinnati Entertainment Award nominations in 2017 in the categories of Best New Artist and Best Indie/Alternative Artist. Guitarist Loren Turner performed briefly with a group called Trxlleydxdgers (pronounced "trolley dodgers") in 2016. Keyboardist Sky White performs with the J Dorsey Band and founded the Wendigo Tea Company in 2015.

=== 2020: Reunion and Burn ===
On February 7, 2020, the official Foxy Shazam Instagram and Twitter released a teaser trailer of the band's return, featuring lead singer Eric Sean Nally. The band released three singles in 2020: "Burn", "Dreamer", and "The Rose". On August 12, 2020, the band uploaded a music video for "Dreamer" alongside a new band photograph showing their new drummer Teddy Aitkins and masked bassist "Trigger Warning". Shortly after the shooting of the videoclip for dreamer, guitarist Loren Turner left the band. In October 2020, they announced their sixth studio album, Burn, which was released on December 11, 2020. For the recording process of the album, the band split up into duos; pianist Sky White and drummer Teddy Aitkins recorded their parts in the Legendary London Bridge studio in Seattle, guitarist Loren Turner and bassist "Trigger Warning" recorded at The LodgeKY studio in Dayton, Kentucky. Finally, vocalist Eric Nally and hornplayer Alex Nauth added their parts in Ryan Lewis' Mundon Canyon Studios to complete the album. It was released on both vinyl and CD on their own label eeeoooah releases.

=== 2022: The Heart Behead You and Hidden Treasures Tour ===
On October 5, 2021, the band announced their seventh studio album, The Heart Behead You, and released a short vignette featuring the opening track of the new album "I'm in Love". The album was released on Valentine's Day, February 14, 2022. This was the first Foxy Shazam album to feature the band's new guitarist Devin Williams.

On October 27, 2021, the group announced the first leg of the Hidden Treasures Tour, which would begin with their previously announced return show at the Andrew J. Brady Music Center in Cincinnati on February 12, 2022 (which had been rescheduled twice due to the COVID-19 Pandemic), and include seven other stops in the northeastern United States. American blues and soul singer-songwriter Robert Finley opened for Foxy on all stops on this leg of the tour.

On January 18, 2022, the band released the official music video for "Dancing with My Demons", the second single from The Heart Behead You.

On March 30, 2022, the band announced an additional nine dates for their Hidden Treasures Tour. Jigsaw Youth opened for Foxy for all of these additional dates.

On June 30, 2022, the band released a remaster of their debut album, The Flamingo Trigger, on digital streaming services and stores. Later that night, a pre-sale began for both vinyl and CD versions of the album. This was the first time The Flamingo Trigger was officially available anywhere outside of the initial set of CDs that had been sold at the CD release party in 2005 and on their subsequent tour. The 2022 vinyl presale included a limited edition bundle containing a teal-colored pressing of the album, an exclusive t-shirt, and an original flyer from the 2005 CD release show (the bundle was limited to only 200 copies). A gold-colored pressing limited to 180 copies was also made available after the teal bundle sold out. Both limited editions sold out by the early afternoon on Friday, July 1, 2022. The vinyl was released in March 2023.

On July 28, 2022, the band announced the last of the dates for their Hidden Treasures Tour. Thumpasaurus, Shamon Cassette, and Lung (former Foxy bassist Daisy Caplan's current band) each opened some of the dates. This leg of the tour included a performance at Riot Fest, an annual Chicago punk rock music festival.

=== 2023: Dark Blue Night and tour with Head Automatica ===
On March 17, 2023, Foxy Shazam released their new 18-song album Dark Blue Night with almost no prior promotion. It was available for vinyl and CD preorder, with the vinyl coming in an "Ice Disk Blue" colored pressing. Bundles with a vinyl and exclusive shirt were also available.

In July 2023, Head Automatica announced their first tour since 2012, with Foxy Shazam as support. The tour took place throughout September and early October, with 18 dates crossing the United States from Seattle to New York. Foxy Shazam did not perform at what would have been their hometown show in Cincinnati, Ohio, although they added a few headlining shows in between dates with Head Automatica.

On New Year's Eve 2023, the band performed at the Andrew J. Brady Music Center in their hometown of Cincinnati, Ohio, with Tweens as support. The show included a countdown to midnight and the live debuts of some songs from Dark Blue Night.

In July 2024, the band played 3 shows in Indiana, Illinois, and Wisconsin surrounding their performance at 80/35 Music Festival in Iowa.

=== 2025: Animality Opera, Rockin' Rolla Coast Tour, and Box of Magic ===
In January 2025, the band released the single "Rhumbatorium" and announced their ninth album, Animality Opera. They released the second single "Pink Sky" on February 13, 2025, with Animality Opera itself coming out on March 20. The promotion for the album included a 3D interactive website created with Metimmerse, which can be viewed here; items inside its rainforest landscape linked to the presale for the CD/vinyl purchase and tickets for the band's upcoming shows. Animality Opera included spoken word verses from artist Shamon Cassette (who opened for Foxy Shazam on their Hidden Treasures tour in 2022) throughout the album.

In spring 2025, the band embarked on the Rockin' Rolla Coast Tour, a 5-week headlining tour across the United States. The Number Twelve Looks Like You and Lobby Boxer opened, with sideshow performers from Coney Island on most dates. The tour was well-received, with reviewer Joe Abbruscato comparing it to "Freddie Mercury getting an adrenaline shot straight to the heart and being set loose on a pop rock-infused acid trip at Coney Island" and calling it "exquisite, joyous, theatrical chaos".

On August 8, 2025, lead single "Magic" from their upcoming tenth album, Box of Magic, was released. The album was recorded at EastWest Studios in Hollywood and will feature an appearance from actor and musician Corey Feldman. The band will support the album with headlining appearances in September 2025, as well as opening for pop rock band Waterparks in December 2025.

== Music style and influences ==
Many media outlets compare the band to Queen and Meat Loaf because of its use of theatrics and over-the-top lyrics. Andrew Winney stated, "If Noel Fielding and Freddie Mercury had a love child it would be Eric Nally." The magazine Alternative Press compared the band to bands like Queen, My Chemical Romance, and The Darkness, while also believing that the band has a unique sound that should best be seen live.

== Involvement with James Gunn ==
Director and filmmaker James Gunn has featured Foxy Shazam's music in several of his projects in the DC Universe, and has described them as "objectively the greatest rock 'n' roll band in the world".

The song "Welcome to the Church of Rock and Roll" from their 2012 album The Church of Rock and Roll was used in the first episode of the first season of Gunn's HBO Max series Peacemaker, as well as in the second official trailer. In July 2025, the band performed at Peacefest, an official Peacemaker-themed experience at San Diego Comic Con, where Gunn announced that the song "Oh Lord" from their 2010 self-titled album would be used in the new opening dance sequence for the show's second season. Gunn chose the song since he felt the lyrics applied to the storyline in season 2. In the final episode of the show's second season, the band made a cameo appearance performing "Oh Lord" onscreen.

The band, with vocalist Lou Lou Safran, recorded the original song "The Mighty Crabjoys Theme" for Gunn's 2025 film Superman; it was written by Gunn, Nally, and guitarist Devin Williams. However, they are not pictured in the posters for the fictional band the Mighty Crabjoys, although Nally has an unrelated cameo in the film. The band also received a "Special Thanks" in the credits.

== Origin of their name ==
The band name was claimed to have originated from a slang phrase used by students at Nally's high school. "Foxy shazams" meant 'cool shoes' (e.g. "Damn, those are some foxy shazams!"). In a Rockline radio interview in March 2012, Nally stated that this was not the case by saying that the truth is not as interesting as real life; he had been lying about it for five years and it stuck. This was later confirmed by Nauth and McVeigh in an interview with Norse Media in July 2012.

== Members ==
Current members

- Eric Nally – lead vocals (2004–2014, 2020–present)
- Schuyler "Sky" White – keyboards (2004–2014, 2020–present)
- Alex Nauth – horns, backing vocals (2008–2014, 2020–present)
- Misster Universe (Note: Formerly known as Trigger Warning during the Burn and The Heart Behead You album cycles, The Persistent Savage during the Dark Blue Night album cycle, and Existential Youth during the Animality Opera album cycle.) – bass guitar (2006-2007 tour fill-in, 2020–present)
- Teddy Aitkins – drums (2007, 2020–present)
- Devin Williams – guitar (2020–present)

Former members

- Loren Turner – guitar (2004–2014, 2020), drums (2005 tour fill-in), bass (2014)
- Skylyn Ohlenkamp – bass guitar (2004–2006)
- John Sims – drums (2004–2005)
- Ryan Hogle – guitar (2005)
- Baron Walker – keyboards (2005-2006 tour fill-in), bass (2006)
- Elijah Rust – drums (occasionally 2005-2007)
- Jamison Pack – drums (2006)
- Eli White – bass guitar (2006 tour fill-in)
- Daisy Caplan – bass guitar (2006–2014), guitar (2014)
- Kevin Hogle – drums (occasionally 2006-2007)
- Joseph Halberstadt – drums (2007–2009)
- Aaron McVeigh – drums (2009–2014)

== Discography ==
=== Albums ===
==== Studio albums ====
List of studio albums, with selected chart positions
Title	Album details	Peak chart positions		
Title	Album details	US	US Alt.	US Rock
The Flamingo Trigger	Released: June 15, 2005; Label: Self-released; Formats: CD, digital download	—	—	—
Introducing	Released: January 22, 2008; Label: Ferret; Formats: CD, LP, digital download	—	—	—
Foxy Shazam	Released: April 13, 2010; Label: Sire; Formats: CD, LP, digital download	151	—	50
The Church of Rock and Roll	Released: January 24, 2012; Label: I.R.S.; Formats: CD, LP, digital download	115	24	35
Gonzo	Released: April 2, 2014; Label: Self-released; Formats: LP, digital download	—	—	—
Burn	Released: December 11, 2020; Label: eeeoooah; Formats: CD, LP, digital download	—	—	—
The Heart Behead You	Released: February 14, 2022; Label: eeeoooah; Formats: CD, LP, digital download	—	—	—
Dark Blue Night	Released: March 17, 2023; Label: eeeoooah; Formats: CD, LP, digital download	—	—	—
Animality Opera	Released: March 20, 2025; Label: eeeoooah; Formats: CD, LP, digital download	—	—	—
Box of Magic	Release date: October 6, 2025; Label: eeeoooah; Formats: CD, LP, digital download	—	—	—
"—" denotes a recording that did not chart or was not released in that territory.

=== Singles ===
List of singles, with selected chart positions, showing year released and album name
Title	Year	Peak chart positions					Album
Title	Year	US Sales	US Act. Rock	US Alt.	US Main. Rock	US Rock	Album
"The French Passion of Animality Opera"	2005	—	—	—	—	—	The Flamingo Trigger
"A Dangerous Man"	2008	—	—	—	—	—	Introducing
"Wanna-Be Angel"	2009	6	—	—	—	—	Foxy Shazam
"Unstoppable"	2010	—	—	—	—	—	Foxy Shazam
"Oh Lord"	2010	—	—	—	—	—	Foxy Shazam
"I Like It"	2011	—	5	20	5	8	The Church of Rock and Roll
"Holy Touch"	2012	—	34	—	39	—	The Church of Rock and Roll
"Welcome to the Church of Rock and Roll"	2012	—	40	—	—	—	The Church of Rock and Roll
"Burn"	2020	—	—	—	—	—	Burn
"Dreamer"	2020	—	—	—	—	—	Burn
"The Rose"	2020	—	—	—	—	—	Burn
"Not Dark Yet"	2021	—	—	—	—	—	Non-album single
"I'm In Love"	2022	—	—	—	—	—	The Heart Behead You
"Dancing With My Demons"	2022	—	—	—	—	—	The Heart Behead You
"Rhumbatorium"	2025	—	—	—	—	—	Animality Opera
"Pink Sky"	2025	—	—	—	—	—	Animality Opera
"Magic"	2025	—	—	—	—	—	Box of Magic
"You Know My Name"	2025	—	—	—	—	—	Box of Magic
"—" denotes a recording that did not chart or was not released in that territory.

=== Music videos ===
List of music videos, showing year released and director
Title	Year	Director(s)
"The French Passion of Animality Opera"	2005	Donnie Moore
"A Dangerous Man"	2008	Jeremy E. Jackson
"Unstoppable"	2010	Jeremy E. Jackson
"Oh Lord"	2010	Jeremy E. Jackson
"I Like It"	2012	Bill Fishman
"Holy Touch"	2012	Shane Valdes
"Welcome to the Church of Rock and Roll"	2012	Eric Nally
"Tragic Thrill"	2014	Ryan Mackfall
"Dreamer"	2020	Scott Fredette and Eric Nally
"I'm In Love"	2022	Scott Fredette
"Dancing With My Demons"	2022	Paul Coors and Eric Nally
"Man in Bloom"	2023	Nikita Gross
"I Can Change for You"	2024	Nic Cox and Emily Denney
"You Know My Name"	2025	Eric Nally; co-directed by Jaakko Manninen and Jesse Korman
"Too Fast To Let Go"	2025	Eric Nally

=== Other appearances ===
List of non-single guest appearances, showing year released and album name
Title	Year	Album
"Walking in the Air"	2009	Gift Wrapped
"Heaven on Their Minds"	2010	Gift Wrapped, Vol. 2: Snowed In
"Drain You"	2011	Newermind: A Tribute to Nirvana
