= Frickin' A =

American pop rock band

Frickin A
- Origin: Cincinnati, Ohio, United States
- Genres: Pop rock
- Years active: 1999–2005
- Label: Toucan Cove/Madacy
- Members: Jason Phelps; Dave Harris; Jason Short; Scott McCann
- Website: www.frickina.com

Frickin A was a pop rock band from Cincinnati, Ohio. They are best known for their remake of Rick Springfield's "Jessie's Girl" and their 2004 single "Merry Merry Merry Frickin' Christmas".

Frickin A is the only band ever to achieve placement in the Now! That's What I Call Music series while signed to an independent record label. The music video for "Jessie's Girl" achieved regular rotation on VH1 in 2005. The music video was directed by Bill Fishman from a concept by David Herrera (music video director).

Frickin' A was featured on Boston's Kiss 108 2004 Jingle Ball Christmas concert. The band's first single was "Trend", written by the band, which received some airplay on VH-1 but did not become a hit. Late in 2004, the group released a single with "Merry Merry Merry Frickin' Christmas" and "Jessie's Girl" on it; the single reached No. 2 on the Billboard Singles Sales chart.

The group's original numbers have been compared to Fountains of Wayne and Bowling for Soup. Their full-length, Big Egos...No Ideas, was a regional sales success in the American Midwest, reaching No. 9 on the Billboard Heatseekers chart for that area.

The band also sings "The Reds Are on the Radio," the theme for the Cincinnati Reds radio network.

The members of the band were most recently lead singer Jason Phelps, guitarist Dave Harris, bassist Jason Short, and drummer Scott McCann.

== Discography ==
=== Studio albums ===
Big Egos...No Ideas (2004, Toucan Cove/Madacy)

=== Singles ===
"Merry Merry Merry Frickin' Christmas" (2004, Toucan Cove/Madacy)
