= I Like It (Foxy Shazam song) =

Single by Foxy Shazam

from the album The Church of Rock and Roll
- Released: October 24, 2011
- Recorded: Bungalow Castle
- Genre: Hard rock; glam rock; alternative rock
- Length: 2:48
- Label: I.R.S. Records
- Songwriters: Justin Hawkins, Eric Sean Nally, Loren Daniel Turner, Christopher Baker Schwartz. Schuyler Vaughn White, Aaron McVeigh, Alex Nauth,
- Producer: Justin Hawkins

Foxy Shazam singles chronology
| "Oh Lord" (2010) | "I Like It" (2011) | "Holy Touch" (2012) |

"I Like It" is the lead single from American rock band Foxy Shazam's fourth studio album, The Church of Rock and Roll. It was released as a free download on Foxy Shazam's website and Facebook page on October 6, 2011 before being released on iTunes. It is their highest charting single to date peaking at #5 on the Mainstream Rock Charts.

== Reception ==
Miles Raymer of the Chicago Reader wrote about "I Like It" that, "I'm not saying that front man Eric Sean Nally or anyone else in Foxy Shazam is racist. But their song is definitely racist." He said that the song is not "pro-black woman" but "pro-big black ass", and that "the lines about 'my gangsta girl' who uses 'sexy, street-talkin' slang' are straight-up Fetishizing the Other, which comes with the baggage of several hundred years of gruesome treatment of black women."

== Music video ==
A music video directed by Bill Fishman was released online on 6 February 2012. It was filmed at the First German Reformed Church in Cincinnati, Ohio, which keyboardist Sky White had purchased with two other friends. For the video, Foxy Shazam invited fans to come dressed up as Time Warp dancers from Rocky Horror Picture Show or as 90's club kids.

== Track listing ==
7" vinyl

1. "I Like It"
2. "I'll Be Home Soon Mother Earth"

CD Promo

1. "I Like It"
2. "I Like It (Instrumental)"

== Charts ==
=== Weekly charts ===
| Chart (2012) | Peak position |
|---|---|
| Canada Rock (Billboard) | 37 |
| US Alternative Airplay (Billboard) | 20 |
| US Mainstream Rock (Billboard) | 5 |
| US Hot Rock & Alternative Songs (Billboard) | 8 |

=== Year-end charts ===
| Chart (2012) | Position |
|---|---|
| US Hot Rock & Alternative Songs (Billboard) | 64 |
