= Electric Love Muffin =

Electric Love Muffin was a Philadelphia-based hard rocking quartet of the late 1980s that spiked the melodic thrash-pop of The Replacements, Soul Asylum and other indie bands of the period with touches of country/western, classic rock and progressive rock.

== History ==
Electric Love Muffin quickly became a club and college radio favorite in Philadelphia and beyond. The band released two full albums, Playdoh Meathook (1987) and Rassafranna (1989), plus an EP, Second Third Time Around (1990). While the band's original songs won raves from critics, imaginative covers of The Beatles' "Norwegian Wood (This Bird Has Flown)" and the '60s chestnut "Venus" (then best known for Bananarama's version) were highlights of the live set.

The band dissolved in 1990, shortly before the rise to musical stardom of similarly inspired acts like Nirvana. However, the band has managed to maintain a lasting impression on their audience of their music and live performances, and occasional reunions over the subsequent decade and a half after their breakup have gathered Philadelphia club audiences.
