= Village Nightclub =

Coordinates: 40.041717°N 76.305060°W

The Village Nightclub, also known as The Village, is a nightclub and music venue located in Lancaster, Pennsylvania. The club opened Dec 4, 1954.

The club since has hosted performances by Blue Öyster Cult, Cheap Trick, Dio, Kansas, Cyndi Lauper, Bruce Springsteen, and other bands and musicians.
