= Gift Wrapped – 20 Songs That Keep on Giving! =

Gift Wrapped - 20 Songs That Keep On Giving!

Compilation album by Various artists
- Released: 1 December 2009
- Recorded: 2004; 2009
- Genre: Christmas, Alternative rock, Indie rock, Pop
- Length: 61:33
- Label: Warner Bros. Records Inc

Various artists chronology
Gift Wrapped - 20 Songs That Keep On Giving! (2009)	Gift Wrapped Vol. II (2010)

Gift Wrapped - 20 Songs That Keep on Giving! or Gift Wrapped is a Christmas compilation album which was released in the United States on 1 December 2009 to iTunes and 8 December 2009 on Amazon.com. The album contains covers, live tracks and an original songs from artists under the Warner Bros. Records Inc label and its subsidiaries. The cover of Mariah Carey's All I Want for Christmas Is You by My Chemical Romance appears on the 2004 album Kevin & Bean's Christmastime in the 909.

The album cover is a copy of Patti Page Christmas Album.

== Track listing ==
1. "Let It Snow, Let It Snow, Let It Snow (Live)" by Michael Bublé - 2:24
2. "All I Want for Christmas Is You" by My Chemical Romance - 3:44
3. "A Change at Christmas (Say It Isn't So)" by The Flaming Lips - 5:21
4. "This Time of Year" by Nikki & Rich - 3:23
5. "Walking in the Air" by Foxy Shazam - 4:07
6. "The Lights and Buzz" by Jack's Mannequin - 3:35
7. "Silver Bells" by Meaghan Smith - 3:07
8. "Winter Wonderland" by Randy Travis - 2:21
9. "My Dear Acquaintance (A Happy New Year)" by Regina Spektor - 2:51
10. "Have Yourself a Merry Little Christmas" by Tyler Hilton - 2:52
11. "(When Is) Hanukkah This Year?" by Mêlée - 2:33
12. "Alone This Holiday" by The Used - 2:55
13. "30days" by Never Shout Never - 3:11
14. "Santa Claus Is Back in Town" by Dwight Yoakam - 2:39
15. "Santa's Lost His Mojo" by Jeremy Lister - 2:47
16. "Merry Christmas, Here's to Many More" by Relient K - 2:51
17. "All I Want for Christmas Is You" by Whitney Duncan - 4:07
18. "You're a Mean One, Mr. Grinch" by The Brian Setzer Orchestra - 2:36
19. "Silent Night" by Blake Shelton - 2:43
20. "Deck the Halls" by R.E.M. - 1:13
