= The Sharks (band) =

American new wave band

- Origin: Lancaster, Pennsylvania, U.S.
- Years active: 1979-1990, 1995-2020
- Labels: LList Records, Elektra Records
- Past members: Sam Lugar, Guitar, Vocals, Dave Sheaffer, Bass, Vocals Steve Zero, Guitar, Vocals Doug Phillips, Drums, Vocals Shea Quinn, Bass, Back-up Vocals Mark Showers, Keyboard Roger Girke, Guitar Stephen McKnight, Guitar Kevin Vecchione, Bass

The Sharks were a new wave band from Lancaster, Pennsylvania from early 1980s to mid-1990s.

== History ==
The band members started by playing cover versions of songs by new wave artists such as Elvis Costello, U2, and Talking Heads, but soon progressed to performing their own material as The Sharks. The band built up a regular following, playing gigs up and down the East coast. They were frequent headliners at The Village Nightclub in Lancaster, Pa., The Metron, a new wave/rock club in Harrisburg, PA and had a massive following in numerous club venues in South Central and South Eastern Pa.

Their first single caught the ear of Billy Terrel, who asked the band to record a cover of "Fly Like an Eagle" for the Philadelphia Eagles Super Bowl XV team. This led to a guest spot on AM Philadelphia and gigs at venues such as New York's CBGB.

They won MTV's Basement Tape Competition in 1985 by the largest margin in the history of the MTV Basement Tape Competition, leading to a four song EP contract and MTV video with Elektra Records, who immediately put The Sharks into RPM Studios and The Power Station in NYC to record In A Black and White World which featured "On My Own" and "Only Time Will Tell". Videos for both songs were shot on location in Times Square in NYC. "Only Time Will Tell" was the second most requested song during MTV's Top 10 Countdown for 2 weeks in a row in 1988. With the success of the Elektra release and the support of MTV, the Sharks toured and shared the stage with The Go-Go's, A Flock of Seagulls, Robert Palmer, Joan Jett and The Blackhearts, The Romantics, Night Ranger, The Fixx, and The Stray Cats. Elektra Records dropped the band shortly after fulfilling their contractual obligations.The band continued to tour and record, building off of their popularity in the Central Pa area. In 1986 guitarist Steve Zero, was replaced by Philadelphia-based guitarist, Roger Girke. With 12 successful years and a lifetime of great memories, The Sharks decided to call it quits in 1992. The Sharks, with members Shea Quinn, Sam Lugar, Doug Phillips, Mark Showers and Steve Zero, had reunited yearly at The Village Nightclub in Lancaster, Pennsylvania for reunion concerts until 2021. Dave Sheaffer (original bass player) is a retired music teacher for the ELCO Middle school and Girke has been an active blues performer since 1990. Doug Phillips continues to write music under different names such as Bugger West and Danny Bond. In 2026, Doug Phillips released an 11 track LP entitled "Heavy Kind Of Hoping" under his name d.c. phillips and a new Bugger West LP to be released in late 2026

On October 8, 2009, lead singer Sam (Lugar) Rawhauser died of lung cancer, disbanding the band.

The Sharks performed reunion shows periodically prior to and following the death of Sam (Lugar) Rawhauser from 1999 until 2021 throughout the Central Pennsylvania area. Fan videos are available on the YouTube video platform, articles written about the reunion shows are available at Lancaster Online. .

== Photos ==
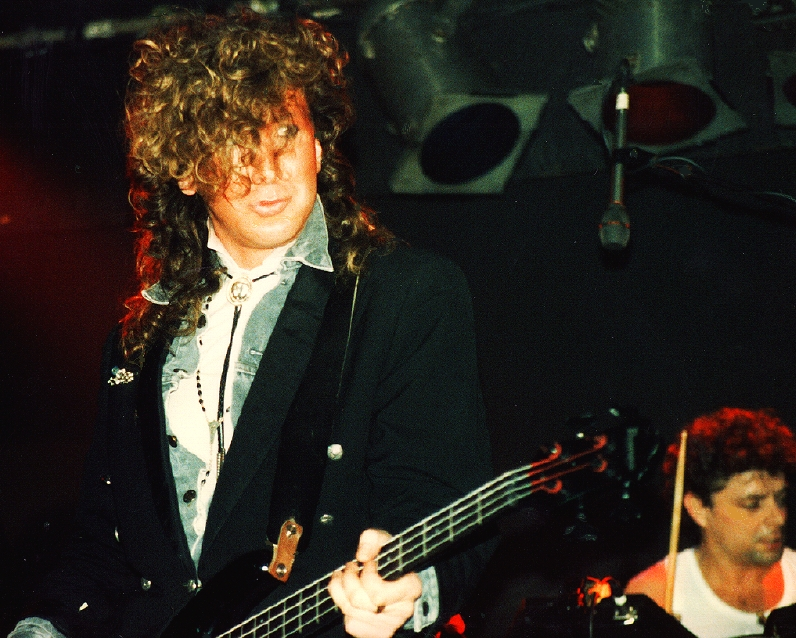
The Sharks - (Shea Quinn / Doug Phillips) The Stone Balloon - Newark, Delaware - circa 1986

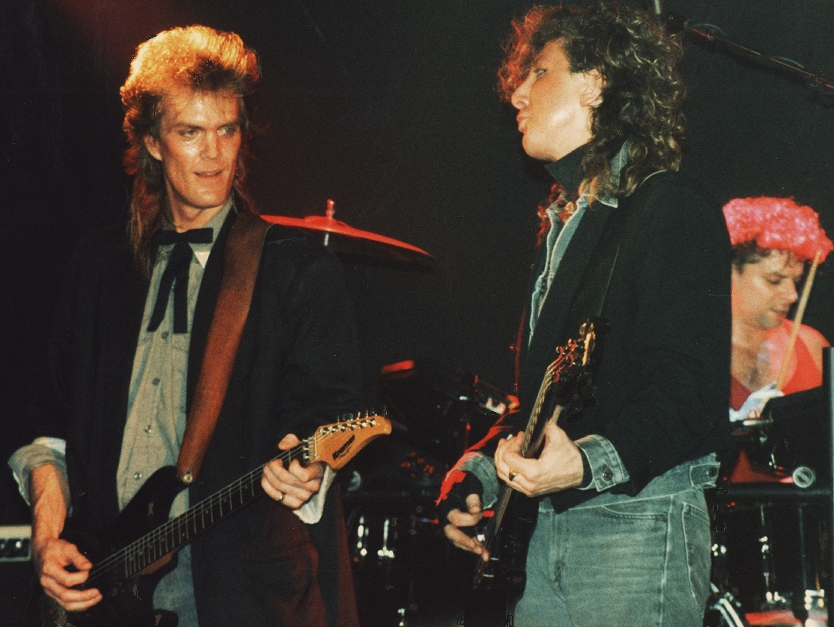
The Sharks - (Sam Lugar / Shea Quinn / Doug Phillips) The Stone Balloon - Newark, Delaware - circa 1986
