= Johann Friedrich Peter =

German-American composer

- Born: May 19, 1746; Heerendijk, Holland
- Died: July 13, 1813 (aged 67); Bethlehem, Pennsylvania, U.S.

Johann Friedrich Peter (sometimes John Frederick Peter) (May 19, 1746 – July 13, 1813) was an American composer of German origin and the one who first brought the music of Joseph Haydn to the United States.

== Bio ==
Johann Friedrich Peter was born on May 19, 1746, in Heerendijk, Holland, to German parents Susannah Peter and Moravian pastor John Frederick Peter. Peter was educated in Holland and Germany before coming to America with his brother Simon in 1770. He began to compose music for the church shortly after his arrival in America, and for a time, served as an organist and violinist in the Moravian congregations of Nazareth, Bethlehem and Lititz in Pennsylvania. In 1780, he moved to Salem, North Carolina, and received his ordination as a Moravian deacon on September 16 of that year.

He married Catharina Leinbach in 1786 in Salem, North Carolina and lived there until their departure in 1790.

All of Peter's known compositions are sacred concerted vocal works or anthems composed for worship services with the exception of the string quintets. His six string quintets for two violins, two violas, and a violoncello are among the earliest examples of chamber music known by a North American composer. The six string quintets, performed by the American Moravian Chamber Ensemble, were recorded and published in 1997 on New World Records 80507-2. The third string quintet is sometimes called Sinfonia in G when played with a string orchestra. Sinfonia in G is not a separate composition.

Johann Friedrich Peter was born in Herrndyck, Holland. His father was a Moravian minister. In 1760 the elder Peter was transferred to Bethlehem, Pennsylvania. Johann followed nine years later after a steeping in several seminaries. Like all Moravian theologians his training included extensive instruction in music, but he seems to have sought proficiency as well in violin, flute, and horn. In addition, his self-pedagogy consisted of copying scores that struck his fancy, and apparently his tastes were as good as they were broad. He copied fully a dozen symphonies by Carl Friedrich Abel, two by Johann Christoph Friedrich Bach that are not otherwise extant, some trios by Stamitz, numerous chamber works of Haydn (along with the only known copy of his long-lost Symphony No. 17), and literally hundreds of other, variously worthy scores.

As to his style, consequently, Peter was eclectic, the influence of Haydn and Boccherini being strongest throughout his catalogue. His scores were his only teachers in composition, the preponderance of his education having been in applied music. Indeed, for all his lifetime of devotion to the craft aspects of his art, he actually mentioned music but twice in the lengthy Lebenslauf on file in the Moravian archives. At one point he expresses his thanks to we Almighty for enabling him to embellish the liturgy of the Moravian service. At another, he speaks rather cryptically of the temptations into which his musical talent had led him; and again he thanks his Saviour for restoring his tranquility of spirit through an illness.

The listener is free to wonder what sins Peter committed in the name of Euterpe, but it is probable that any falling from grace on his part had to do with his lone adventure in secular music. This was the six-week period early in 1789 during which, at Salem, North Carolina, he wrote six quintets for two violins, two violas, and cello. Whether or not Peter was ashamed of his caper is not chronicled, but this grouping represents the only music he ever saved that is not an anthem or some similarly religious work, and by synodical decree the Moravians have always been assiduous about saving the fruits of their labor. More than a hundred Peter originals repose in the church archives.

All of the six quintets are gracefully made in accordance with the dictates then prevailing. Of the grouping only one— the No. 3 in G recorded herewith—is laid out in the classical four movements, the others being limited to the Italianate three. All are freely conceived, with elaboration the rule rather than development as such, and all are melodious in the extreme. The present work opens with a charming Presto dolce, continues with a Polonaise and a Minuet, and closes with a sparking Presto. In this performance the various parts are augmented to string orchestra proportions, but the original ratio is of course retained.
