= Macklemore discography =

Alternative hip hop recording artist discography

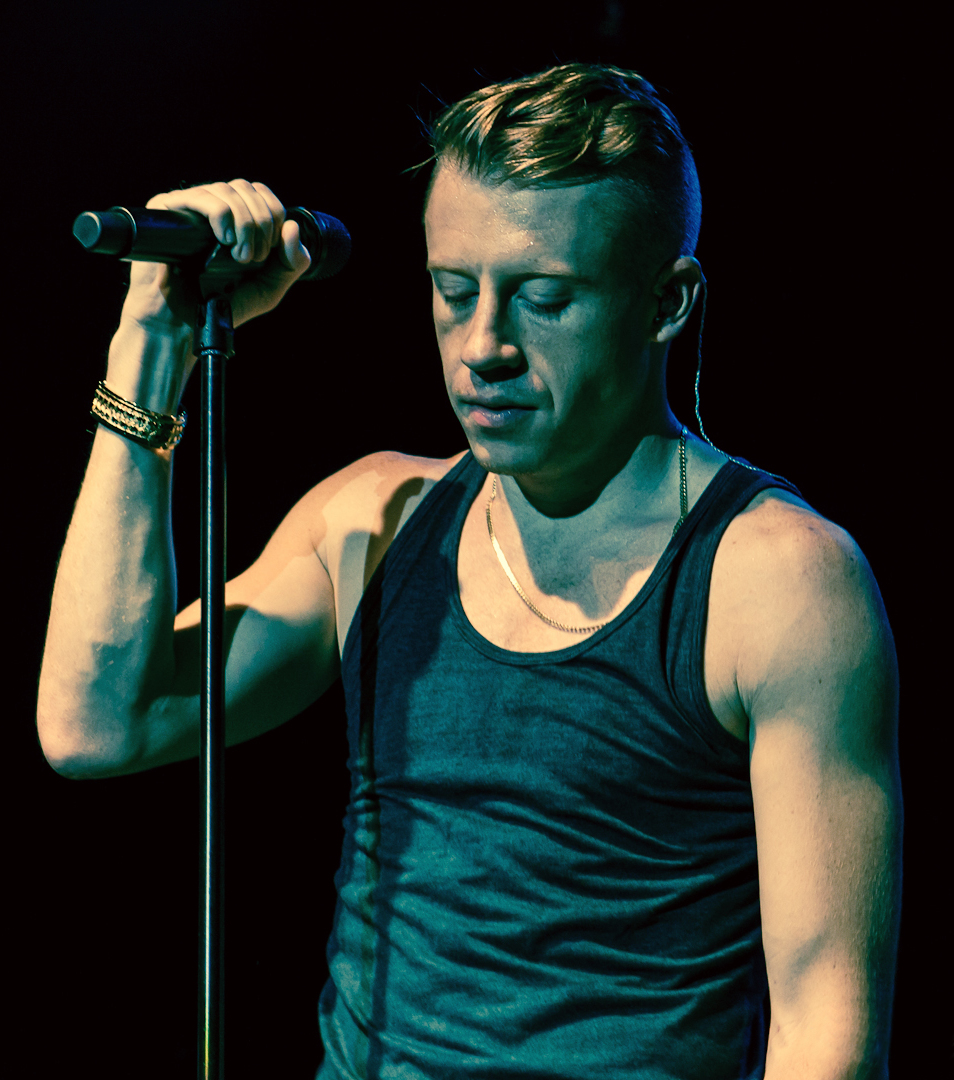
- Macklemore performing in Toronto during "The Heist Tour" in November 2012
- Studio albums: 3
- Extended plays: 2
- Singles: 20
- Music videos: 11
- Mixtapes: 3

American rapper Macklemore has released three studio albums and two mixtapes as a solo artist. The origin of the name Macklemore is from when Haggerty attended Nathan Hale High School and was required to invent a superhero for an art project. At the beginning of his musical career, he recorded an EP titled Open Your Eyes in 2000 under the name Professor Macklemore, which he distributed himself. This initial work of his was also considered a mixtape, as some of the songs on this EP were written separately. His only official mixtape, The Unplanned Mixtape, released in 2009, consisted of ten songs. Macklemore dropped "Professor" from his name, and released his first official full-length album, The Language of My World in January 2005. He appeared as a featured artist on The Physics' song "Good" in 2009. In 2008, 2009, and 2011, Macklemore performed at Bumbershoot, a major arts and music festival in Seattle. In 2009 he released The Unplanned Mixtape, which reached No. 7 on iTunes. Macklemore's debut single "The Town" was released from The Unplanned Mixtape and later remixed by Sabzi of the Blue Scholars. In 2017, he released his second studio album Gemini, which reached No. 2 on the US Billboard 200.

== Albums ==
=== Studio albums ===
List of studio albums, with selected chart positions
Title	Album details	Peak chart positions										Certifications
Title	Album details	US	AUS	AUT	CAN	FRA	IRE	NZ	SWE	SWI	UK	Certifications
The Language of My World	Released: January 1, 2005; Label: Self-released; Formats: CD, digital download	—	—	—	—	—	—	—	—	—	—	
Gemini	Released: September 22, 2017; Label: Bendo; Formats: CD, digital download	2	3	6	1	22	6	3	7	3	13	RIAA: Platinum; ARIA: Gold; MC: Gold; SNEP: Gold
Ben	Released: March 3, 2023; Label: Bendo; Formats: CD, Vinyl, digital download	18	48	17	61	80	—	—	—	17	— (Note: Ben did not enter the UK Albums Chart, but peaked at number 26 on the UK Albums Sales Chart.)	
"—" denotes releases that did not chart or were not released in that territory.

=== Mixtapes ===
List of mixtapes
Title	Album details
Open Your Eyes	Released: October 21, 2000; Label: Macklemore; Format: CD
The Unplanned Mixtape	Released: September 7, 2009; Label: Macklemore; Format: Digital download

== Singles ==
=== As lead artist ===
List of songs, with selected chart positions and certifications
Title	Year	Peak chart positions										Certifications	Album
Title	Year	US	AUS	AUT	CAN	FRA	IRE	NZ	SWE	SWI	UK	Certifications	Album
"Love Song" (featuring Evan Roman)	2005	—	—	—	—	—	—	—	—	—	—		The Language of My World
"The Town"	2009	—	—	—	—	—	—	—	—	—	—		The Unplanned Mixtape
"And We Danced" (featuring Ziggy Stardust)	2011	—	—	4	— (Note: "And We Danced" did not enter the Billboard Canadian Hot 100, but peaked at number 69 on the Canadian Digital Song Sales chart.)	89	67	—	—	36	—	IFPI SWI: Gold	The Unplanned Mixtape
"Drug Dealer" (featuring Ariana DeBoo)	2016	—	—	—	56	—	—	—	—	—	—		Non-album single
"Glorious" (featuring Skylar Grey)	2017	49	2	12	27	20	9	1	11	17	23	RIAA: 3× Platinum; ARIA: 6× Platinum; BPI: Platinum; MC: 2× Platinum; RMNZ: 6× Platinum; SNEP: Diamond	Gemini
"Marmalade" (featuring Lil Yachty)	2017	— (Note: "Marmalade" did not enter the Billboard Hot 100, but peaked at number one on the Bubbling Under Hot 100 chart.)	80	—	49	—	—	— (Note: "Marmalade" did not enter the NZ Top 40 Singles Chart, but peaked at number three on the NZ Heatseeker Singles Chart.)	—	97	— (Note: "Marmalade" did not enter the UK Singles Chart, but peaked at number 26 on the UK Singles Sales Chart.)	RIAA: 2× Platinum; MC: Gold; RMNZ: Gold	Gemini
"Good Old Days" (featuring Kesha)	2017	48	8	24	40	56	34	14	83	24	79	RIAA: 3× Platinum; ARIA: 4× Platinum; BPI: Silver; MC: 2× Platinum; RMNZ: 3× Platinum	Gemini
"I Don't Belong in This Club" (with Why Don't We)	2019	— (Note: "I Don't Belong in This Club" did not enter the Billboard Hot 100, but peaked at number 32 on the Digital Songs chart.)	80	—	— (Note: "I Don't Belong in This Club" did not enter the Billboard Canadian Hot 100, but peaked at number 36 on the Canadian Digital Song Sales chart.)	—	63	25	87	—	— (Note: "I Don't Belong in This Club" did not enter the UK Singles Chart, but peaked at number 94 on the UK Singles Sales Chart.)	RIAA: Gold; RMNZ: Platinum	Non-album singles
"Shadow" (featuring Iro)	2019	— (Note: "Shadow" did not enter the Billboard Hot 100, but peaked at number 23 on the Digital Songs chart.)	— (Note: "Shadow" did not enter the ARIA Singles Chart, but peaked at number 35 on the ARIA Digital Track Chart.)	—	— (Note: "Shadow" did not enter the Billboard Canadian Hot 100, but peaked at number 36 on the Canadian Digital Song Sales chart.)	—	—	— (Note: "Shadow" did not enter the NZ Top 40 Singles Chart, but peaked at number 21 on the NZ Hot Singles Chart.)	—	74	—		Non-album singles
"Next Year" (featuring Windser)	2021	—	—	—	—	—	—	— (Note: "Next Year" did not enter the NZ Top 40 Singles Chart, but peaked at number 30 on the NZ Hot Singles Chart.)	—	—	—		Non-album singles
"Chant" (with Tones and I)	2022	— (Note: "Chant" did not enter the Billboard Hot 100, but peaked at number 31 on the Digital Songs chart.)	81	—	— (Note: "Chant" did not enter the Billboard Canadian Hot 100, but peaked at number 29 on the Canadian Digital Song Sales chart.)	—	—	— (Note: "Chant" did not enter the NZ Top 40 Singles Chart, but peaked at number eight on the NZ Hot Singles Chart.)	—	—	—		Ben
"Maniac" (featuring Windser)	2022	—	—	—	—	—	—	— (Note: "Maniac" did not enter the NZ Top 40 Singles Chart, but peaked at number 32 on the NZ Hot Singles Chart.)	—	— (Note: "Maniac" did not enter the Swiss Singles chart, but charted at number 56 on the Swiss Airplay chart.)	—		Ben
"Faithful" (featuring NLE Choppa)	2022	—	—	—	—	—	—	—	—	—	—		Ben
"Heroes" (featuring DJ Premier)	2023	—	—	—	—	—	—	—	—	—	—		Ben
"No Bad Days" (featuring Collett)	2023	— (Note: "No Bad Days" did not enter the Billboard Hot 100, but peaked at number 43 on the Digital Songs chart.)	—	—	—	—	—	— (Note: "No Bad Days" did not enter the NZ Top 40 Singles Chart, but peaked at number 20 on the NZ Hot Singles Chart.)	—	—	—		Ben
"Hind's Hall"	2024	— (Note: "Hind's Hall" did not enter the Billboard Hot 100, but peaked at number 7 on the Digital Song Sales chart.)	85	—	61	125	29	33	—	—	51		Non-album singles
"Hind's Hall 2" (featuring Anees, MC Abdul and Amer Zahr)	2024	—	—	—	—	—	—	—	—	—	— (Note: "Hind's Hall 2" did not enter the UK Singles Chart, but peaked at number 51 on the UK Singles Sales Chart.)		Non-album singles
"Fucked Up"	2025	—	—	—	—	—	—	—	—	—	— (Note: "Fucked Up" did not enter the UK Singles Chart, but peaked at number 87 on the UK Singles Sales Chart.)		Non-album singles
"—" denotes releases that did not chart or were not released in that territory.

=== As featured artist ===
List of singles as featured artist, with selected chart positions
Title	Year	Peak chart positions										Certifications	Album
Title	Year	US	AUS	AUT	CAN	FRA	IRE	NZ	SWE	SWI	UK	Certifications	Album
"Letterhead (Remix)" (Sapient featuring Illmaculate and Macklemore)	2011	—	—	—	—	—	—	—	—	—	—		Non-album remix
"Gold Rush" (Clinton Sparks featuring 2 Chainz, Macklemore and D.A.)	2013	—	—	—	—	—	—	—	—	—	—		ICONoclast
"Rio (Remix)" (Netsky featuring Macklemore and Digital Farm Animals)	2016	—	—	—	—	—	—	—	—	—	—		3
"FDT, Pt. 2" (YG featuring G-Eazy and Macklemore)	2016	—	—	—	—	—	—	—	—	—	—		Red Friday
"Free" (Torii Wolf featuring Macklemore and DJ Premier)	2017	—	—	—	—	—	—	—	—	—	—		Flow Riiot
"These Days" (Rudimental featuring Jess Glynne, Macklemore and Dan Caplen)	2018	— (Note: "These Days" did not enter the Billboard Hot 100, but peaked at number five on the Bubbling Under Hot 100 chart.)	2	1	31	16	3	4	2	3	1	RIAA: Platinum; ARIA: 5× Platinum; BPI: 5× Platinum; IFPI AUT: Platinum; MC: 2× Platinum; RMNZ: 5× Platinum; SNEP: Platinum	Toast to Our Differences
"Summer Days" (Martin Garrix featuring Macklemore and Patrick Stump)	2019	100	47	13	37	26	8	— (Note: "Summer Days" did not enter the NZ Top 40 Singles Chart, but peaked at number 12 on the NZ Hot Singles Chart.)	34	22	26	RIAA: Gold; ARIA: Gold; BPI: Gold; IFPI AUT: Gold; RMNZ: Platinum; SNEP: Gold	Non-album single
"—" denotes releases that did not chart or were not released in that territory.

=== Promotional singles ===
List of promotional singles, with selected chart positions and certifications
Title	Year	Album
"Wednesday Morning"	2016	Non-album singles
"It's Christmas Time" (featuring Dan Caplen)	2019	Non-album singles

== Other charted songs ==
List of songs, with selected chart positions and certifications
Title	Year	Peak chart positions			Album
Title	Year	AUT	NZ Heat.	SWI	Album
"Ain't Gonna Die Tonight" (featuring Eric Nally)	2017	73	3	67	Gemini
"Willy Wonka" (featuring Offset)	2017	—	4	—	Gemini
"—" denotes releases that did not chart or were not released in that territory.

== Other appearances ==
List of non-single guest appearances, with other performing artists, showing year released and album name
Title	Year	Other artist(s)	Album
"Crushes Heaven"	2005	Abyssinian Creole	Sexy Beast
"I'm Free"	2006	Xperience	Soultree
"Pet Peeves"	2007	Ricky Pharoe, Grynch, Tru I.D.	Random Songs
"Reachin'"	2007	Scribes, Sol	Sleepwalk
"Seattle Style"	2007	Pinder, Grynch	Backpack Wax
"Understand"	2007	Eastern Sunz	Nine Triangles
"If Only"	2008	Grynch, C-Nik	My Second Wind
"Soul Steps"	2008	Notion, Neema	Late Nights Until Now
"Put in Work"	2008	Wizdom, New Balance	The Book of Wizdom
"Keep Walking"	2008	The Gigantics, Xperience	Die Already
"Close Your Eyes"	2009	CunninLynguists, Grieves and Geologic	Strange Journey Volume Two
"Good"	2009	The Physics	High Society
"What They Came Here For"	2010	Suntonio Bandanaz	Who Is... Suntonio Bandanaz?!
"Cinnamon Nights"	2010	Candidt, TLove	Sweatsuit & Churchshoes
"Macklemore Intro"	2010	Wizdom, DJ Swervewon	The Washington Wizard Mixtape
"Polarity"	2010	Zion I, Locksmith	Atomic Clock
"Rule the Roost"	2010	Whiskey Blanket	No Object
"Tommy Chong"	2011	Blue Scholars	Cinemetropolis
"Blazin' High"	2012	The World Famous Tony Williams, Wale, Emilio Rojas	Some of My Best Rappers Are Friends
"A Chat with Mack"	2012	DEFicit	Not Listening
"Fallin'"	2013	bSw, Elaine Sharp, Nate Monoxide, Stephanie Kay	Trials & Tribulations
"I Love Myself"	2019	Ciara	Beauty Marks
"Glass Ceiling"	2019	Travis Thompson, Sir Mix-a-Lot, Prometheus Brown	Reckless Endangerment
"House of Mirrors"	2019	Mary Lambert	Grief Creature
"Firse Machayenge" (Remix)	2020	Emiway Bantai	Non-album remix

== Music videos ==
List of music videos, showing year released and directors
As lead artist
Title	Year	Director(s)	Ref.
"The Town"	2009	Zia Mohajerjasbi	
"And We Danced"	2011	Griff J and Ryan Lewis	
"Drug Dealer"	2016	Jason Koenig	
"Glorious"	2017	Jason Koenig	
"Marmalade"	2017	Jason Koenig and Ben Haggerty	
"Good Old Days"	2017	Johnny Valencia	
"Corner Store"	2017	Johnny LeFlare	
"How to Play the Flute"	2018	Jake Magraw	
"Hind's Hall"	2024	Macklemore	
"Fucked Up"	2025	Omar Alali	
As featured artist
Title	Year	Director(s)	Ref.
"Gold Rush" (Clinton Sparks featuring Macklemore)	2013	Matty Barnes	
"My City's Filthy" (Wizdom featuring Macklemore)	2014	Jeff Santos	
"These Days" (Rudimental featuring Macklemore)	2018	Johnny Valencia	
"I Don't Belong in This Club" (Why Don't We featuring Macklemore)	2019	Jason Koenig	
"Summer Days" (Martin Garrix featuring Macklemore)	2019	Colin Tilley	
