= Next Year (Macklemore song) =

2021 single by Macklemore and Ryan Lewis featuring Windser

Single by Macklemore featuring Windser
- Released: October 29, 2021
- Recorded: 2021
- Length: 2:53
- Label: Bendo
- Songwriters: Ben Haggerty; Ryan Lewis
- Producer: Ryan Lewis

Macklemore singles chronology
"It's Christmas Time" (2021)	"Next Year" (2021)	"Chant" (2022)

Windser singles chronology
"July" (2020)	"Next Year" (2021)	"Memory" (2021)

Music video
- "Next Year" on YouTube

"Next Year" is a song by American rapper Macklemore featuring singer Windser, produced by Ryan Lewis and released as a single on October 29, 2021. It marked Macklemore and Lewis's first collaborative release in five years, following their 2016 album This Unruly Mess I've Made.

== Background ==
According to Complex, "Next Year" was Macklemore and Lewis's first joint musical effort since This Unruly Mess I've Made, an album which had itself served as the follow-up to their Grammy-winning 2012 debut The Heist. Lewis produced the track, marking his return to production work with Macklemore after the pair had spent several years working independently.

Macklemore said Lewis had first played him a rough demo of the song in his car, and that it "immediately stood out," Macklemore subsequently quickly wrote verses and travelled to Los Angeles to record. Lewis recalled that once the pair got back into the studio together, "it was like everything had changed and yet nothing had changed at all," adding that working on the song "turned into working on the video, which then turned into late nights and a lot of laughing." Macklemore said he had wanted Windser, then known for having previously served as vocalist and guitarist of the band Mainland, on the track "From The Jump" after hearing his reference demo.

== Composition ==
NME's Will Lavin described "Next Year" as an "optimistic" track addressing the difficulties of the COVID-19 pandemic. Windser, who is credited as a featured vocalist on the song's chorus, described his involvement as "a true honor," saying the song "resonates with me in such a powerful way."

== Music video ==
The music video was directed by Jason Koenig and Ryan Lewis, marking another collaboration with Koenig, who had also directed the videos for Macklemore and Lewis's "Can't Hold Us" and "Downtown". According to Complex, the video is a "metaphorical" and comedic visual depicting Macklemore surviving a series of mishaps, including car crashes, a barrage of stray golf balls, and the birth of a baby who "may or may not" be his neighbor's. The golf-related imagery in the video was described by his team as a reference to Macklemore's golf apparel brand, Bogey Boys.

Macklemore and his daughter (five-years-old at the time) in June 2020

Ahead of the single's release, Macklemore shared a promotional video on Instagram in which his then-six-year-old daughter, Sloane, gave a critique of "Next Year" after listening to it through headphones. In the clip, Sloane told her father the song was "not your best but I still love ya," and suggested he recruit Taylor Swift, Adele, or Camila Cabello as additional collaborators. She also correctly identified Lewis's involvement in the production, asking, "Did Ryan produce this? He's extra." Macklemore captioned the post, "I use to think I was my own worst critic… Then I had kids."

== Reception ==
Writing for American Songwriter in 2022, Jacob Uitti ranked "Next Year" sixth on a list of the top 10 Macklemore songs.

== Charts ==
Chart performance for "Next Year"
Chart (2021)	Peak position
New Zealand Hot Singles (Recorded Music NZ)	30

== Personnel ==
- Ben Haggerty – vocals, songwriting
- Windser – vocals
- Ryan Lewis – production, songwriting
