= And We Danced =

And We Danced may refer to:

- "And We Danced" (Macklemore song)
- "And We Danced" (The Hooters song)
