= Livingston (musician) =

American singer-songwriter

- Born: Drake Jon Livingston Jr. July 11, 2002 (age 24); Dallas, Texas, U.S.
- Origin: Denton, Texas, U.S.
- Genre: Pop
- Occupations: Musician; singer; songwriter
- Years active: 2020–present
- Labels: Big Up Entertainment, licensed to Republic Records (since 2023); Elektra Records (2020-2023)
- Website: livingstonofficial.com

Drake Jon Livingston Jr. (born July 11, 2002) is an American singer-songwriter. He was raised in Denton, Texas.

Livingston's professional career began when he started posting music covers on the social media app TikTok. After some of his covers gained popularity, he was signed to Elektra Records and released his debut single, "Fairytale", both on February 19, 2020. In the following months, he released three more singles and an extended play, Lighthouse, on July 15, 2020. In 2021 and 2022, he released six singles, and another EP, An Unlikely Origin Story, before leaving Elektra in March 2023. As an independent artist licensed to Republic Records, he has released singles such as "Half Life" and "Last Man Standing", as well as his debut album, A Hometown Odyssey, which debuted at no. 92 on the Canadian Albums chart.

== Early life ==
Livingston was born in Dallas and grew up in Denton, Texas. He attended Coram Deo Academy. He was diagnosed with autism at the age of 10. When he was 12, he started a small videography company, which sparked his interest in storytelling. Soon after, he discovered writing songs and purchased a MIDI keyboard and started producing his own music in his bedroom. He found it to be a very effective way to communicate his emotions, as he was often bullied in school. He drew inspiration for his music from artists such as Macklemore and Jon Bellion.

== Career ==
Livingston was signed to Elektra Records and released "Fairytale" on February 19, 2020. He released his first EP, Lighthouse, on July 15 of the same year. He released his second EP, An Unlikely Origin Story in 2021, and released 3 more singles until his departure from Elektra in early March 2023. He was the opener for Witt Lowry's "If You Don't Like The Story Write Your Own" North American tour from February to April 2023. On Macklemore's album Ben, released March 3, 2023, Livingston was featured on the track "Sorry". He released "Lifetime", his first single as an "independent artist", under his own label that is licensed to Republic Records on the 31st of that month. He went on to release five more singles, including "Last Man Standing", before releasing his debut album, A Hometown Odyssey, on March 8, 2024. He announced his first North American headline tour, "A Hometown Odyssey Tour," on February 26, and pre-sale tickets went on sale the following day. On April 22, he announced that he was bringing the tour to Europe and the UK. All 27 shows across North America, the UK, and Europe sold out. Exactly four months later, on July 22, he announced a second North American leg of the same tour; he played shows in 26 cities that were not included in the first leg. Another European leg was announced on November 4, this time visiting 17 different cities.

On January 13, 2025, Livingston announced his single "Brainstorm" would be released on the 24th of that month. He also announced a deluxe version of his album, titled A Hometown Odyssey: The Story Continues, which released on March 7th - almost exactly one year after the album's original release. To accompany the deluxe album and its nine additional tracks, he also announced a brand new North American tour, titled "The Story Continues Tour." It features 22 cities in the United States and four in Canada.

== Discography ==
=== Studio albums ===
List of studio albums, with selected details
Title	Details
A Hometown Odyssey	Released: March 8, 2024; Format: Digital download; Label: Big Up Entertainment, licensed to Republic Records

=== Extended plays ===
List of extended plays, with selected details
Title	Details
Lighthouse	Released: July 15, 2020; Format: Digital download; Label: Elektra
An Unlikely Origin Story	Released: May 14, 2021; Format: Digital download; Label: Elektra

=== Singles ===
Title	Year	Peak chart positions
Title	Year	NZ Hot
"Fairytale"	2020	—
"Home"	2020	—
"Young"	2020	—
"Say the Word"	2020	—
"Superkid"	2020	—
"Hercules"	2021	—
"The Giver"	2021	—
"Message in a Bottle"	2021	—
"The Author"	2022	—
"Religion"	2022	—
"Lifetime"	2023	—
"Hurricane"	2023	—
"Half Life"	2023	—
"Traitor"	2023	—
"Otherside"	2023	—
"Last Man Standing"	2024	—
"Gravedigger"	2024	35
"Look Mom I Can Fly"	2024	—
"Glow"	2024	—
"Brainstorm"	2025	—
"Paper Crowns"	2026	—
"Recognize"	2026	—
"Radiostar"	2026	—
"Shapeshifter"	2026	—
"Faces"	2026	—

== Tours ==
Headlining

- A Hometown Odyssey Tour (2024-2025)
- The Story Continues Tour (2025)

Supporting

- Fitz and the Tantrums (2021)
- Witt Lowry - If You Don't Like The Story Write Your Own Tour (2023)
