= It's Christmas Time =

It's Christmas Time may refer to:

== Albums ==
- It's Christmas Time (Elvis Presley album), a 1985 reissue of Elvis' Christmas Album (1957)
- It's Christmas Time (Judith Durham album), 2013
- It's Christmas Time, by Cascada, 2012

== Songs ==
- "It's Christmas Time" (Sarah Engels song), 2011
- "It's Christmas Time" (Status Quo song), 2008
- "It's Christmas Time", a song by Macklemore, 2019

== See also ==
- "It's Christmas Time Again", a song by Backstreet Boys, 2012
