= Ben (Macklemore album) =

Studio album by Macklemore
- Released: March 3, 2023
- Recorded: 2020–2022
- Genre: Hip-hop
- Length: 54:03
- Labels: Bendo; Warner
- Producers: Budo; Brian Wall; Daoud; Kid Culture; Macklemore; Naz; Ryan Lewis; Sam Wish; Tyler Dopps

Macklemore chronology
Gemini (2017)	Ben (2023)

Singles from Ben
- 1. "Chant" Released: July 22, 2022; 2. "Maniac" Released: August 19, 2022; 3. "Faithful" Released: October 28, 2022; 4. "Heroes" Released: January 20, 2023; 5. "No Bad Days" Released: March 14, 2023

Ben is the third solo studio album by American rapper Macklemore. It was released on March 3, 2023, by Bendo and Warner Music. It features guest appearances by charlieonnafriday, Collett, DJ Premier, Jackson Lee Morgan, Windser, Livingston, Morray, NLE Choppa, Sarah Barthel, Tones and I, and Vic Daggs II. It is his first album in 6 years since his 2017 album Gemini. The album was recorded between 2020 and 2022.

The album garnered positive reviews from critics. Ben debuted and peaked at number 18 on the Billboard 200 and spawned five singles: "Chant", "Maniac", "Faithful", "Heroes" and "No Bad Days".

== Background and promotion ==
Macklemore officially revealed the album's release date and cover art on November 7, 2022. He has stated that much of the album's content was influenced by his relapse with alcohol addiction during the COVID-19 lockdowns: "I think that pain is a catalyst for great art," he said. "I don't want to inflict the pain on myself anymore to make art. It's not like I need to self-sabotage in order to create, but I think that it created some darker, more honest, and vulnerable moments on the album."

On February 16, 2023, Macklemore and his seven-year-old daughter, Sloane, filmed part of their music video for "No Bad Days" at the Climate Pledge Arena during a Seattle Kraken hockey game. Sloane directed the entire music video, which was released March 3, 2023.

=== Singles ===
The album was preceded by four singles. The first single, "Chant" with Tones and I, was released on July 22, 2022. The second single, "Maniac" featuring Windser, was released on August 19, 2022. The third single, "Faithful" featuring NLE Choppa, was released on October 28, 2022. The fourth single, "Heroes" featuring DJ Premier, was released on January 20, 2023. The fifth single, "No Bad Days" featuring Collett, was released to contemporary hit radio on March 14, 2023.

== Ben Tour ==
Ben
- Tour by Macklemore
- Start date: April 3, 2023
- End date: July 11, 2024
- Legs: 6
- No. of shows: 70

=== Setlist ===
1. "Chant"
2. "Thrift Shop"
3. "No Bad Days"
4. "Downtown"
5. "Same Love"
6. "White Walls"
7. "Maniac"
8. "Heroes"
9. "Wings"
10. "Otherside"
11. "These Days"
12. "Starting Over"
13. "1984"
14. "And We Danced"
15. "Dance Off"
16. "Glorious"
17. "Tail Lights"
18. "The Town"
19. "My Oh My"
20. "Good Old Days"
21. "Can't Hold Us"

=== Tour dates ===
List of concerts, showing date, city, country and venue
Date	City	Country	Venue
2023
Europe
April 3	Dublin	Ireland	3Arena
April 4	Dublin	Ireland	3Arena
April 7	Glasgow	Scotland	O2 Academy
April 9	Manchester	England	Victoria Warehouse
April 11	Birmingham	England	O2 Academy
April 12	London	England	Brixton Academy
April 16	Amsterdam	Netherlands	AFAS Live
April 17	Brussels	Belgium	Forest National
April 18	Paris	France	Zénith Paris
April 19	Paris	France	Zénith Paris
April 21	Cologne	Germany	Lanxess Arena
April 22	Berlin	Germany	Verti Music Hall
April 24	Munich	Germany	Olympiahalle
April 25	Offenbach	Germany	Stadthalle
April 27	Hamburg	Germany	Edel-optics.de Arena
April 29	Warsaw	Poland	EXPO XXI
April 39	Vienna	Austria	Wiener Stadthalle
May 2	Zürich	Switzerland	The Hall
May 3	Milan	Italy	Alcatraz
May 4	Milan	Italy	Alcatraz
May 6	Stavanger	Norway	Kongeparken
May 7	Copenhagen	Denmark	Vega
May 9	Oslo	Norway	Sentrum Scene
May 11	Stockholm	Sweden	Gröna Lund
June 29	Marmande	France	Plaine De La Filhole
July 1	St. Gallen	Switzerland	Open Air St. Gallen
July 2	Arras	France	Main Square Festival
July 20	Bonțida	Romania	Electric Castle
July 22	Ostrava	Czechia	Colours of Ostrava
August 11	Saalburg	Germany	SonneMondSterne
August 16	Esch-sur-Alzette	Luxembourg	Rockhal
August 20	Hasselt	Belgium	Pukkelpop
September 10	Berlin	Germany	Lollapalooza
North America
September 17	Nashville	United States	Ryman Auditorium
September 19	Washington, D.C.	United States	The Anthem
September 21	Boston	United States	MGM Music Hall at Fenway
September 22	New York City	United States	The Rooftop at Pier 17
September 23	Philadelphia	United States	The Met
September 26	Toronto	Canada	Rebel
September 27	Detroit	United States	The Fillmore
September 29	Chicago	United States	Aragon Ballroom
September 30	Milwaukee	United States	The Rave/Eagles Club
October 1	Minneapolis	United States	Minneapolis Armory
October 3	Denver	United States	Mission Ballroom
October 5	Salt Lake City	United States	The Complex
October 7	Portland	United States	Roseland Theater
October 8	Portland	United States	Roseland Theater
October 9	Portland	United States	Roseland Theater
October 10	Spokane	United States	Spokane Arena
October 11	Missoula	United States	Adams Center
October 12	Boise	United States	Idaho Central Arena
October 14	San Francisco	United States	The Masonic
October 17	Phoenix	United States	Arizona Financial Theatre
October 18	Los Angeles	United States	Hollywood Palladium
Middle East
October 28	Dubai	UAE	Coca-Cola Arena
North America
December 21	Seattle	United States	Climate Pledge Arena
December 22	Seattle	United States	Climate Pledge Arena
2024
Oceania
May 8	Wellington	New Zealand	TSB Arena
May 9	Auckland	New Zealand	Spark Arena
May 11	Sydney	Australia	Hordern Pavilion
May 12	Sydney	Australia	Hordern Pavilion
May 13	Sydney	Australia	Hordern Pavilion
May 15	Melbourne	Australia	Rod Laver Arena
May 17	Brisbane	Australia	Riverstage
May 18	Darwin	Australia	Bassinthegrass
May 20	Perth	Australia	HBF Stadium
May 21	Perth	Australia	HBF Stadium
Europe
May 31	Hanover	Germany	EXPO Plaza
June 1	Mönchengladbach	Germany	Warsteiner HockeyPark
July 11	Nîmes	France	Arena of Nîmes

== Critical reception ==
Professional ratings
Aggregate scores
Source	Rating
Metacritic	71/100
Review scores
Source	Rating
AllMusic	4.5/5 stars
HipHopDX	2.4/5
Pitchfork	6.0/10
Rolling Stone	3.5/5 stars

Ben was met with generally positive reviews. At Metacritic, which assigns a normalized rating out of 100 to reviews from professional publications, the album received an average score of 71, based on four reviews.

Neil Z. Yeung of AllMusic wrote, "Altogether, Ben feels like the first time Macklemore has truly let listeners into his inner world, showcasing his underrated lyrical skills and enough varied production to keep the album moving forward toward a hopeful finish." Clayton Purdom of Rolling Stone stated, "To be sure, Ben features plenty of catharsis and oversharing, but it also has no grand answers or conclusions, just apologies, acceptance, and ambiguity. Some of Ben's success must be attributed to the producer Budo, a longtime collaborator, here providing skillful texture to the album's broader arc, but the truth is that Macklemore, who on his last album rhymed 'porno' with 'DiGiorno,' has matured. Ben is handily his best album. It's a midcareer downshift from an artist who desperately needed it."

In a mixed review, Matthew Ismael Ruiz of Pitchfork wrote, "These experiences, while certainly authentic, aren't particularly interesting. The struggle of the wealthy and talented white rapper was never especially sympathetic. And on Ben, his trials are mostly internal, the enduring struggle of man to find meaning and leave a legacy. This Macklemore is likely the most honest version we've seen to date." Taylor Rubright of HipHopDX also gave a mixed review, stating "Macklemore is a dexterous rapper at his best, but the songs that showcase his talents are mostly confined to the middle of the album", additionally commenting that "despite some solid songwriting about addiction and mortality, Macklemore's comeback album still experiences the same struggles with corniness and over-sincerity that torpedoed him from a household name to an afterthought, leading to a mixed bag that's more admirable than actualized."

== Track listing ==
Ben track listing
No.	Title	Writer(s)	Producer(s)	Length
1.	"Chant" (featuring Tones and I)	Ben Haggerty; Joshua Karp; Tyler Andrews; Tyler Dopps; Andrew Joslyn; Josephine Howell	Budo; Macklemore	4:30
2.	"No Bad Days" (featuring Collett)	Haggerty; Karp; Andrews; Chloe Gasparini; Dave Dalton	Budo	2:53
3.	"1984"	Haggerty; Karp; Andrews; Dopp; Sam Wishkoski	Budo; Sam Wish; Tyler Dopps	3:24
4.	"Maniac" (featuring Windser)	Haggerty; Karp; Andrews; Jordan Topf; Brian Wall; Ryan Lewis	Budo; Wall; Lewis	3:00
5.	"Day You Die" (featuring Sarah Barthel)	Haggerty; Karp; Sarah Barthel	Budo	3:12
6.	"Heroes" (featuring DJ Premier)	Haggerty; Karp; Christopher Martin; Joshua Rawlings; Terrence B. Cole	Budo; Macklemore^{[c]}	2:55
7.	"Grime"	Haggerty; Karp; Andrews	Budo	3:25
8.	"I Need"	Haggerty; Karp; Andrews; Lewis; Rawlings	Budo	3:39
9.	"Lost / Sun Comes Up" (featuring Jackson Lee Morgan)	Haggerty; Karp; Andrews; Jackson Morgan	Budo	5:51
10.	"Faithful" (featuring NLE Choppa)	Haggerty; Karp; Andrews; Dopps; Bryson Lashun Potts	Budo	3:27
11.	"Tears"	Haggerty; Karp; Dopps; Naz	Naz; Dopps	3:13
12.	"Sorry" (featuring Livingston)	Haggerty; Karp; Drake Livingston; Sasha Sloan	Budo	3:29
13.	"God's Will" (featuring Vic Daggs II)	Haggerty; Karp; Dopps; Daoud Anthony; Jacob Dutton	Budo; Daoud	3:13
14.	"I Know" (featuring Charlieonnafriday)	Haggerty; Karp; Sloan; Charlie Finch; Daniel Hackett	Budo; Kid Culture	2:53
15.	"Tail Lights" (featuring Morray)	Haggerty; Karp; Andrews; Morae Ruffin	Budo	4:50
Total length:				53:55

Note

- ^{^[c]} signifies a co-producer

== Charts ==
Chart performance for Ben
Chart (2023)	Peak position
Australian Albums (ARIA)	48
Austrian Albums (Ö3 Austria)	17
Belgian Albums (Ultratop Flanders)	69
Belgian Albums (Ultratop Wallonia)	107
Canadian Albums (Billboard)	61
French Albums (SNEP)	80
German Albums (Offizielle Top 100)	37
Scottish Albums (Official Charts)	44
Swiss Albums (Schweizer Hitparade)	17
UK Album Downloads (Official Charts)	18
UK Independent Albums (Official Charts)	9
UK R&B Albums (Official Charts)	3
US Billboard 200	18
US Independent Albums (Billboard)	4
US Top Rap Albums (Billboard)	6
