= No Bad Days (disambiguation) =

"No Bad Days" is a song by Macklemore, 2023.

No Bad Days may also refer to:

- "No Bad Days", (NO BAD DAYS®) a lifestyle and resort brand promoting a positive attitude and outlook founded in 1986. NO BAD DAYS® is a registered trademark of No Bad Days Enterprises, Incorporated, which also holds all (IP) Intellectual Property Rights to the words and phrases bearing the mark.
- No Bad Days, a 2014 EP by Sunset Sons
- "No Bad Days", a song by Bastille from their 2022 album Give Me the Future
- "No Bad Days", a song by Flo Rida, 2022
