= Coram Deo Academy =

Christian school in Texas, United States

Coordinates: 33.00889°N 96.98025°W

Information
- School type: Private, Classical Christian school
- Religious affiliation: Christian
- Established: 1999
- President: Jeff Johnson
- Head of school: Jon Jordan (Dallas); Polly Dwyer (Mrs.) (Flower Mound); Robin Scott (Mrs.) (Collin County)
- Grades: PreK-12
- Enrollment: 1466 (2020-2021)
- Website: http://coramdeoacademy.org

Coram Deo Academy (CDA) is a private, classical Christian school for grades Pre-K to 12. CDA has three North Texas campuses located in Collin County, Dallas, and Flower Mound. It is accredited by the Association of Classical and Christian Schools.

== Academic programs ==
Coram Deo Academy consists of a Grammar School (elementary school, grades PreK-4), Logic School (middle school, grades 5-8), and Rhetoric School (high school, grades 9-12).

== Athletics and fine arts ==
Coram Deo Academy sports programs include basketball, football, track, volleyball, and more. Fine arts programs include band, choir, speech and debate, drama, and visual arts.

== Campuses ==
Coram Deo Academy has three campus locations in the Dallas-Fort Worth area:

- The Flower Mound campus (PreK-12) is located at 4900 Wichita Trl. Flower Mound, TX 75022.
- The Collin County campus (PreK-12) was established in 2004, and is located at 9645 Independence Pkwy. Plano, TX 75025.
- The Dallas campus (PreK-12) was established in 2006, is located at 6930 Alpha Rd. Dallas, TX 75240.
- The CDA District Offices are located at 417 Oakbend Dr. Lewisville, TX 75067.

== Notable alumni ==
- James Hanna, former tight end in the NFL for the Dallas Cowboys. He transferred after his sophomore season to Flower Mound High School.
- Livingston (musician), a musician.
