= The Language of My World =

Studio album by Macklemore
- Released: January 1, 2005
- Recorded: 2004
- Genre: Hip-hop
- Length: 73:29
- Label: Self-released
- Producers: Budo; Cameron Sage; Macklemore; Sekken Thaughtz

Macklemore chronology
Open Your Eyes (2000)	The Language of My World (2005)	Gemini (2017)

Singles from The Language of My World
- 1. "Love Song" Released: January 2005

The Language of My World is the debut studio album by American rapper Macklemore, released independently on January 1, 2005. Production was handled by Seattle hip-hop producer and frequent collaborator Budo, Cameron Sage, Sekken Thaughtz, and Macklemore himself.

The album features guest appearances from Abyssinian Creole, Xperience, and Evan Roman, among others. The album was well-received by local critics, who praised the album for its balance of humor and social commentary. It was supported by the single "Love Song", featuring Evan Roman.

== Background and lyrics ==
The Language of My World was Macklemore's first studio release in five years since the release of Open Your Eyes EP, and the first to be released under his solo name after dropping "Professor" from his moniker. The release opened several doors for Macklemore as an artist, earning him a local following and introducing him to key figures in his career such as the Blue Scholars. It was his last solo album before meeting producer Ryan Lewis a year later, with whom he would later release two studio albums.

Much of the album's lyrical content is focused on social issues, along with, among other topics, his childhood observations of social stratification, his first experiences with alcohol and illicit substances, and the concept of white privilege. Throughout the album, Macklemore gives his personal reflections of "growing up in a segregated Seattle as a well-off white kid." Among the album's most successful songs is "White Privilege", in which Macklemore considers his role as a white performer in a traditionally black musical culture. Writing on his blog, Macklemore characterized the project as his "most honest and personal music," noting that he deliberately confronted topics he was "scared to say" to highlight shared human experiences rather than for "shock value." He wrote that artists only possess their "stories, experiences, and imaginations," writing, "When we can admit what we are afraid to say, we open ourselves up to a deeper level of understanding of who we are."

== Track listing ==
All tracks are written by Ben Haggerty and Joshua Karp.

The Language of My World track listing
No.	Title	Producer(s)	Length
1.	"Intro" (Interlude)	Sekken Thaughtz	0:50
2.	"White Privilege"	Budo	4:21
3.	"B-Boy"	Budo; Macklemore	2:46
4.	"Claiming the City" (featuring Abyssinian Creole)	Budo	4:28
5.	"Fake ID"	Macklemore	2:33
6.	"Hold Your Head Up" (featuring Xperience)	Macklemore	4:23
7.	"Ego"	Sekken Thaughtz	2:48
8.	"Inhale Deep"	Budo	2:49
9.	"Bush Song"	Budo	2:51
10.	"Good For You" (featuring Step Cousins)	Cameron Sage	4:01
11.	"I Said Hey"	Budo	4:44
12.	"Penis Song"	Budo	3:33
13.	"The Magic"	Budo	4:22
14.	"City Don't Sleep"	Sekken Thaughtz	3:30
15.	"Love Song" (featuring Evan Roman)	Cameron Sage	4:23
16.	"Remember High School"	Budo	4:08
17.	"Contradiction" (featuring Evan Roman)	Budo	4:28
18.	"Soldiers"	Budo	4:47
19.	"As Soon As I Wake Up" (featuring Xperience)	Budo	3:47
20.	"My Language"	Budo	3:57
Total length:			73:29
