= Sonicsgate =

Sonicsgate: Requiem for a Team
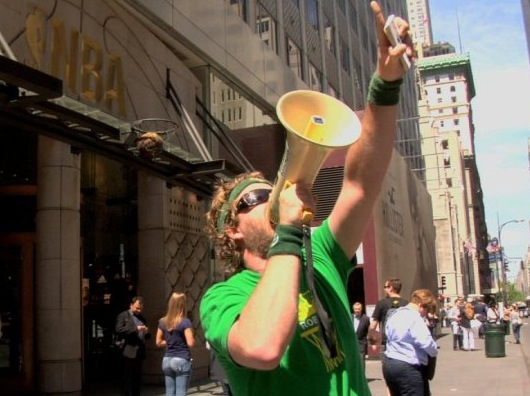
- Sonicsgate director Jason Reid draws attention to the Sonicsgate story speaking through a bullhorn outside the flagship NBA store in New York City.
- Directed by: Jason Reid
- Written by: Adam Brown; Colin Baxter; Darren Lund; Jason Reid; Colin White
- Produced by: Adam Brown; Jason Reid
- Starring: Sherman Alexie; Kevin Calabro; Gary Payton; Chris Daniels; George Karl; Steve Kelley; Slade Gorton; Shawn Kemp; Wally Walker
- Narrated by: John Keister
- Cinematography: Ian J. Connors; Darren Lund; Jason Reid
- Edited by: Darren Lund; Jason Reid; Adam Brown
- Production companies: Green and Gold Media / Seattle Supersonics Historical Preservation Society (SSHPS)
- Distributed by: SSHPS, CNBC, ESPN Classic, iTunes
- Release date: October 9, 2009
- Running time: 120 minutes (original)/44 minutes (CNBC version)
- Country: United States
- Language: English

Sonicsgate: Requiem for a Team is a 2009 American documentary film chronicling the history of the Seattle SuperSonics. The SuperSonics (also known as the Sonics) were a professional basketball franchise based in Seattle, Washington, that was a member of the National Basketball Association (NBA). The Sonics played from 1967 until 2008, but relocated from Seattle to Oklahoma City, Oklahoma, and were renamed as the Thunder.

== Background ==
Sonicsgate chronicles the SuperSonics move to Oklahoma City, focusing on the more scandalous corporate and political reasons why the Sonics left Seattle and became the Oklahoma City Thunder in July 2008. The film contains interviews with former SuperSonics figures and fans, including Gary Payton, George Karl, Wally Walker, Kevin Calabro, Sherman Alexie as well as Seattle and Washington state politicians. It also contains archived local news and press conference footage.

== Release ==
=== Free Internet release ===
On October 12, 2009, the film's producers opted to release the 120-minute feature director's cut online for free viewing on their website without any advertising or revenue sources embedded in order to spread their grassroots message to as wide an audience as possible.

Sonicsgate collected more than 55,000 online views from October 12 to November 10, 2009, and as of November 2020, over 600,000 views.

=== Limited festival screenings ===
Sonicsgate premiered at two sold-out screenings in Seattle at SIFF Cinema (October 9, 2009) and Pacific Place Cinemas (October 10, 2009). SIFF Cinema (Seattle International Film Festival) picked up Sonicsgate for a one-week theatrical run from December 11 to December 17, 2009.

In February 2010, the Beer And Movie Fest (BAM Fest) of Portland, Oregon, selected Sonicsgate to screen at the Bagdad Theater and Pub as part of the four-venue, 50-film festival.

The film's producers independently booked a four-day East Coast premiere in New York City at the People's Improv Theater from April 28 to May 1, 2010. During the NYC premiere, ESPN dedicated an entire episode of its sports journalism program Outside the Lines to the Sonics saga and Sonicsgate movie, showing a 3-minute trailer of the film and having director Jason Reid on as a guest contributor.

In May 2010, the Park City Film Series gave Sonicsgate a special selection to screen in Utah at the Park City Film Music Festival, which recognizes films with the best musical scores and soundtracks. After the festival, Sonicsgate took home the Audience Choice Silver Medal for Excellence.

=== CNBC broadcast and television recut ===
In April 2012, cable news network CNBC announced it had acquired the broadcast rights to a newly updated and re-cut version of Sonicsgate: Requiem for a Team that premiered nationally in prime time on April 27 and 29, produced by Green and Gold Media and released to coincide with the start of the NBA playoffs.

According to the film's producers, unlike the 2009 Free Online Director's Cut, this newly edited and fully re-cut version of the film is fully licensed for television. Cut for a regular TV hour, the new version of the film also includes new graphics, statistics, archive footage, music and interviews with former Sonics star forward Shawn Kemp and Pearl Jam bassist Jeff Ament.

=== ESPN Classic ===
In March 2014, cable sports network ESPN Classic aired Sonicsgate: Requiem for a Team nine times on the weekend of March 14–17. The ESPN family of networks added the film to its roster for continued airings.

=== Digital release ===
In June 2014, content distributor Go Digital released Sonicsgate: Requiem for a Team across all major digital platforms, including iTunes, Google Play, Amazon Video, Xbox, PlayStation and VUDU, followed by Hulu and Amazon Prime in February 2015.

== Awards and festival selections ==
- Winner – "Best Sports Film" at the 2010 Webby Awards
- Nominee – "Best Editing" at the 2010 Webby Awards
- Winner – "Best Twitter Feed - Arts" at the 2011 Seattle Weekly Web Awards
- Winner – "Best Use of Facebook" at the 2011 Seattle Weekly Web Awards
- Winner – "The Wild Card" at the 2011 Seattle Weekly Web Awards
- Winner – "Best Online Presence - Sports" at the 2010 Seattle Weekly Best of the Web Awards
- Nominee – "Best Twitter"; "Best Tweet"; "Best Shameless Self-Promoter" at the 2010 Seattle Weekly Best of the Web Awards
- Special Selection – Park City Film Music Fest
- Winner – Audience Choice Silver Medal for Excellence - Park City Film Music Fest
- Official Selection – Beer and Movie Fest in Portland, Oregon

=== 2010 Webby Awards Gala ===
On June 14, 2010, the 14th Annual Webby Awards Gala was held at Cipriani in New York City. The Webby Awards recognize the best content on the Internet as selected by the International Academy of Digital Arts & Sciences, a 650-person global organization whose members include David Bowie, Harvey Weinstein, Arianna Huffington, Matt Groening, Internet inventor Vinton Cerf, Twitter co-founder Biz Stone and Virgin Group Chairman Richard Branson.

The producers of Sonicsgate were all in attendance to accept the award for Best Sports Film, but they unveiled a special surprise guest to accept the award on stage on their behalf: former Seattle SuperSonics point guard Gary Payton.

As is the Webby Awards tradition, honorees are limited to acceptance speeches of five words or less. Payton said these five words as he accepted the award on behalf of the Sonicsgate filmmakers: "Bring Back Our Seattle SuperSonics!"

Steve Kelley, longtime sports columnist for The Seattle Times who is also interviewed in Sonicsgate, was embedded with the film's producers for the Webby Awards Gala and described the festivities in his column:

As host B.J. Novak from "The Office" introduced him, Payton came on stage to loud applause. (Only Buzz Aldrin received a louder ovation, and he walked on the moon, for crying out loud.)

Payton, dressed in a gray suit, strode to the microphone and said what everyone associated with the film, everybody who came to its showings in Seattle and most everybody who has taken the time to watch it on the Internet, wants most.

"Bring back our Seattle SuperSonics", Payton said forcefully, and this mostly New York crowd stood and cheered as if he'd just said, "Bring back Willis Reed."

Standing alongside Payton, wearing Sonics T-shirts, were the film's executive producer Camp Jones and director Jason Reid. They unfurled a Sonics banner just before Payton's "speech."

"It blew me away", Reid said of the standing ovation.

Sonicsgate was an unconventional piece of filmmaking. It was a full-length documentary, released for free on the Internet. It encapsulated everything this night was about — openness and a new way of expression.

Shortly after the Webby Awards Gala, ESPN blog posted an interview with director Jason Reid on its website.

== Original score and soundtrack ==
The music of Sonicsgate was recognized at the 2010 Park City Film Music Festival in Park City, Utah, winning the Audience Choice Silver Medal for Excellence. The original music score for the film is credited to Seattle-area composers John E. Low, Steve Stearns, and D-Sane. Composers Lil Kriz and Curtis Seals also contributed to the 2009 Online Director's Cut.

The Sonicsgate soundtrack features songs by several Northwest hip hop artists including Jake One, Blue Scholars, Grayskul, Common Market, Dyme Def, Grynch, Neema, Spac3man, Wizdom and Sir Mix-a-Lot. It also features the song "SuperSonics" by Seattle rock band Presidents of the United States of America.

The soundtrack is streaming free online but is not available for sale. Individual tracks are available for purchase through the artists' accounts on third-party sites such as iTunes and Amazon.

== See also ==
- List of basketball films
