= Wizdom =

American musician

David Mazzeo also known as Wizdom, is a hip hop artist based in Seattle, Washington. The emcee has released three studio albums, one mixtape and one EP release. Guests on his music include Brainstorm of Dyme Def, Stef Lang and New Balance(Nate Burleson), and has collaborated with Seattle-based musicians Grynch, Sol and Macklemore.

Wizdom was named a "Stand Out Act of 2008" by The Seattle Weekly, performing at REVERBfest. Wizdom's music and an interview were both featured in the highly praised grassroots film, Sonicsgate.

Wizdom has been featured in articles in Seattle Sound Magazine (August 2009 edition), "The O'Dea Factor", The Seattle Weekly and had music played on KUBE 93.3's show, Sunday Night Sound Session and KEXP 90.3's show, Street Sounds From 2015 to 2018, Wiz served as the on field emcee for University of Washington Husky Football.

Mazzeo attended O'Dea High School and graduated in 1999.

== Discography ==
=== Albums ===
- The Book of Wizdom (2008)
- Music: Soul of the Man (2008)
- Bring it Back EP (2009)
- The Washington Wizard Mixtape (2010)
- Unearthed (2011)
- The Next Step (2014)

=== Singles ===
- "Rec League" (2015)
- "From Me to You" (2017)
- "Back to Work" feat. Wanz (2018)
- "Words of Wisdom" (2018)
- "Breakfast Baller" (2021)
- "Black Tie Attire" (2022)
- "Used to Do feat. Grynch & Wanz" (2023)
- "King of the Ring" (2024)
- "These Moments" (2025)
- "Same Me" (2026)
- "My Heart" (2026)
- "It's Time feat. G.A.S." (2026)

== See also ==
- Hip hop music in the Pacific Northwest
