= No Bad Days =

2023 single by Macklemore featuring Collett

- Remix cover

Single by Macklemore featuring Collett

from the album Ben
- Released: March 14, 2023
- Length: 2:53
- Label: Bendo
- Songwriters: Ben Haggerty; Joshua Karp; Tyler Andrews; Chloe Gasparini; Dave Dalton
- Producer: Budo

Macklemore singles chronology
"Heroes" (2023)	"No Bad Days" (2023)	"Hind's Hall" (2024)

Collett singles chronology
"Wash My Hands" (2020)	"No Bad Days" (2023)

Music video
- "No Bad Days" on YouTube

"No Bad Days" is a song by American rapper Macklemore featuring singer Collett from the former's third solo studio album Ben (2023). It was sent to contemporary hit radio on March 14, 2023, as the album's fifth single. The song was produced by Budo.

== Composition ==
The chorus of the song is performed by Collett. Lyrically, the song is about embracing oneself, staying positive through good and bad experiences and enjoying the best of life.

== Music video ==
An official music video was directed by Macklemore's daughter Sloane, which Macklemore revealed in an Instagram video on February 20, 2023. Released alongside the song on March 3, 2023, it sees the two spending time together, including a karaoke session, hairstyling appointment, and horseback riding. At the end, they visit a Seattle Kraken game.

== Remix ==
An official remix of the song was released on June 9, 2023, and features American rapper Armani White. Alexander Cole of HotNewHipHop gave a favorable review of the remix, commenting "the addition of Armani White works to perfection. He gives off a great verse that matches what’s happening in the song. Not to mention, his chemistry with Macklemore is tangible."

== Live performances ==
On the day of its release, Macklemore performed the song live on Today, as part of the program's Citi Concert Series.

== Charts ==
Chart performance for "No Bad Days"
Chart (2023)	Peak position
New Zealand Hot Singles (RMNZ)	20
San Marino (SMRRTV Top 50)	32
US Digital Song Sales (Billboard)	43
US Pop Airplay (Billboard)	33
