= List of awards and nominations received by Macklemore & Ryan Lewis =

Macklemore & Ryan Lewis awards and nominations
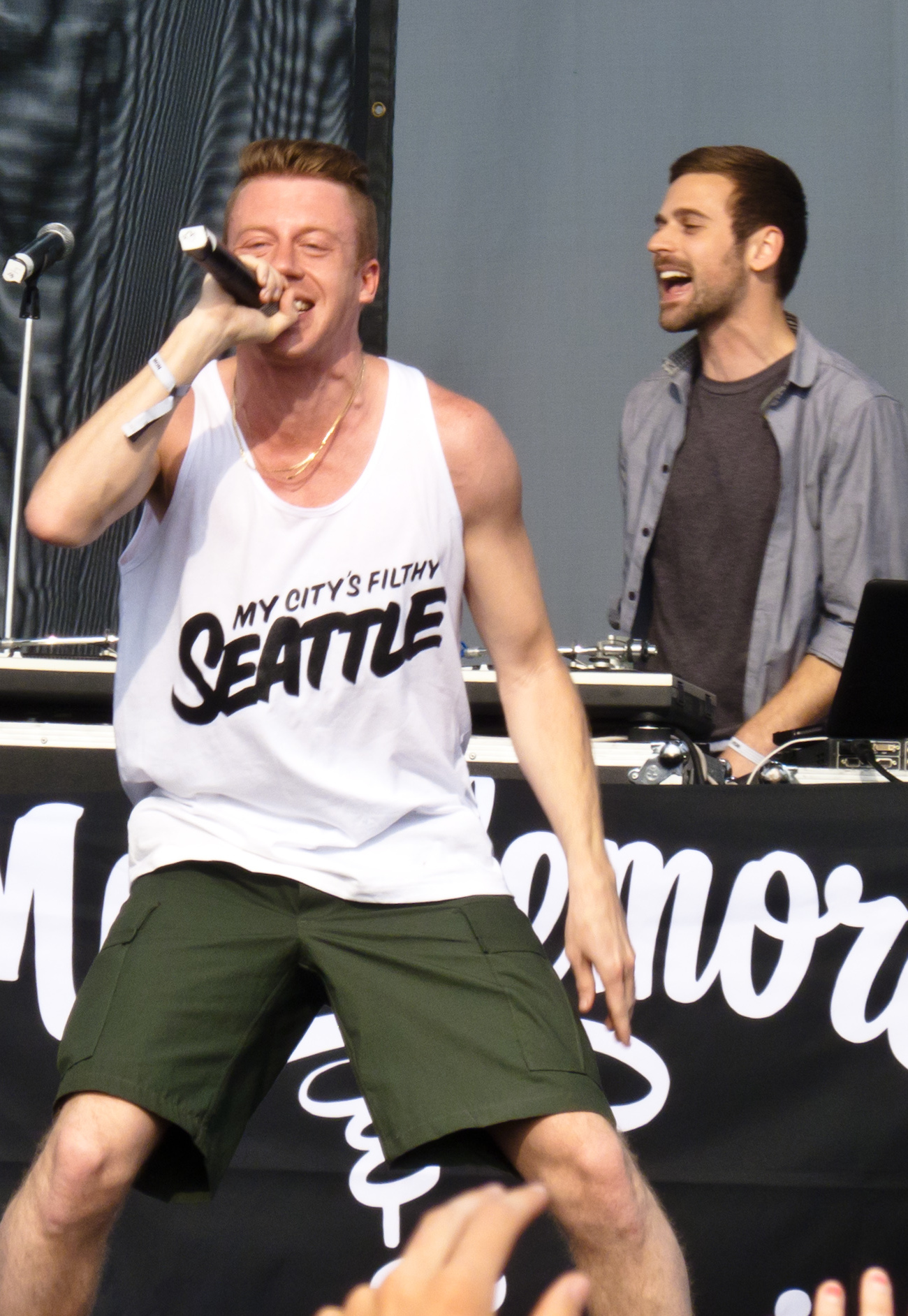
- Macklemore & Ryan Lewis in 2011.
Awards and nominations
Award	Wins	Nominations
Grammy Awards	4	7
MTV Video Music Awards	3	6
MTV Europe Music Awards	2	5
American Music Awards	2	6

Totals (Note: Certain award groups do not simply award one winner. They acknowledge several different recipients, have runners-up, and have third place. Since this is a specific recognition and is different from losing an award, runner-up mentions are considered wins in this award tally. For simplification and to avoid errors, each award in this list has been presumed to have had a prior nomination.)
- Wins: 21
- Nominations: 64

American duo Macklemore & Ryan Lewis received seven nominations at the 56th Annual Grammy Awards, winning four categories, including Best New Artist, Best Rap Album (The Heist), Best Rap Song and Best Rap Performance ("Thrift Shop").

== American Music Awards ==
The American Music Awards, (AMA) is an annual music awards show, created by Dick Clark in 1973 for ABC when the networks contract to present the Grammy Awards expired. Unlike the Grammys, which are awarded on the basis of votes by members of the Recording Academy, the AMAs are determined by a poll of the public and music buyers. Macklemore & Ryan Lewis have won two awards out of six nominations.

Year	Nominee / work	Award	Result
2013	Macklemore & Ryan Lewis	Artist of the Year	Nominated
2013	Macklemore & Ryan Lewis	New Artist of the Year	Nominated
2013	Macklemore & Ryan Lewis	Favorite Pop/Rock Band/Duo/Group	Nominated
2013	Macklemore & Ryan Lewis	Favorite Rap/Hip-Hop Artist	Won
2013	The Heist	Favorite Rap/Hip-Hop Album	Won
2013	"Thrift Shop"	Single of the Year	Nominated

== AIM Awards ==
Year	Nominee / work	Award	Result
2013	Macklemore & Ryan Lewis	Independent breakthrough of the year	Won
2013	Macklemore & Ryan Lewis	PPL award for most played new independent act	Won
2013	"Thrift Shop"	Independent video of the year	Nominated

== ARIA Awards ==
The Australian Recording Industry Association Music Awards (commonly known as ARIA Music Awards or ARIA Awards) is an annual series of awards nights celebrating the Australian music industry, put on by the [[Australian Recording Industry Association (ARIA). Macklemore & Ryan Lewis have received one nomination.

Year	Nominee / work	Award	Result
2013	Macklemore & Ryan Lewis	Best International Artist	Nominated

== BET Awards ==
The BET Awards were established in 2001 by the Black Entertainment Television (BET) network to celebrate African Americans and other minorities in music, acting, sports, and other fields of entertainment. The awards are presented annually and broadcasts live on BET. Macklemore & Ryan Lewis have won one award out of three nominations.

Year	Nominee / work	Award	Result
2013	"Thrift Shop"	Video of the Year	Nominated
2013	Macklemore & Ryan Lewis	Best Group	Won
2014	Macklemore & Ryan Lewis	Best Group	Nominated

== BET Hip Hop Awards ==
The BET Hip Hop Awards are hosted annually by the Black Entertainment Television network for Hip-Hop performers, producers and music video directors. Macklemore & Ryan Lewis have received two nominations.

Year	Nominee / work	Award	Result
2013	"Same Love"	Impact Track	Nominated
2013	"Can't Hold Us"	People's Champ Award	Nominated

== Billboard Music Awards ==
The Billboard Music Awards are sponsored by Billboard Magazine. The awards are based on sales data by Nielsen SoundScan and radio information by Nielsen Broadcast Data Systems. Macklemore & Ryan Lewis have wone two awards out of twelve nominations.

Year	Nominee / work	Award	Result
2013	The Heist	Rap Album of the Year	Nominated
2013	"Thrift Shop"	Rap Song of the Year	Won
2013	"Thrift Shop"	Top Digital Song	Nominated
2014	Macklemore & Ryan Lewis	Top Duo/Group	Nominated
2014	Macklemore & Ryan Lewis	Top Digital Songs Artist	Nominated
2014	Macklemore & Ryan Lewis	Top Streaming Artist	Nominated
2014	Macklemore & Ryan Lewis	Top Rap Artist	Nominated
2014	"Thrift Shop"	Top Streaming Song (Video)	Nominated
2014	"Thrift Shop"	Top Rap Song	Nominated
2014	"Can't Hold Us"	Top Streaming Song (Audio)	Nominated
2014	"Can't Hold Us"	Top Rap Song	Won
2014	The Heist	Top Rap Album	Nominated

== Brit Awards ==
The Brit Awards are the British Phonographic Industry's pop music awards. Macklemore & Ryan Lewis have received one nomination.

Year	Nominee / work	Award	Result
2014	Macklemore & Ryan Lewis	International Group	Nominated

== Grammy Awards ==
The Grammy Awards are awarded annually by the National Academy of Recording Arts and Sciences of the United States. Macklemore & Ryan Lewis have won four awards out of seven nominations.

Year	Nominee / work	Award	Result
2014	"Same Love"	Song of the Year	Nominated
2014	The Heist	Album of the Year	Nominated
2014	The Heist	Best Rap Album	Won
2014	Macklemore & Ryan Lewis	Best New Artist	Won
2014	"Thrift Shop"	Best Rap Performance	Won
2014	"Thrift Shop"	Best Rap Song	Won
2014	"Can't Hold Us"	Best Music Video	Nominated

== iHeartRadio Music Awards ==
The iHeartRadio Music Awards is an international music awards show, founded by iHeartRadio in 2014, and recognizes the most popular artist and music over the past year as determined by the network's listeners. Macklemore & Ryan Lewis have received three nominations.

Year	Nominee / work	Award	Result
2014	Macklemore & Ryan Lewis	Artist of the Year	Nominated
2014	Macklemore & Ryan Lewis	Best New Artist	Nominated
2014	Macklemore & Ryan Lewis	Best Lyrics	Nominated

== Los Premios 40 Principales ==
Year	Nominee / work	Award	Result
2013	Macklemore & Ryan Lewis	Best International New Act	Won
2013	"Can't Hold Us"	Best International Video	Nominated

== Major League Soccer (MLS) ==
As a co-owner of Seattle Sounders FC, Macklemore is credited as being an MLS Cup Champion after the team won the title in 2019.

Year	Nominee / work	Award	Result
2019	Macklemore	2019 MLS Cup	Won

== MTV Awards ==
=== MTV Europe Music Awards ===
The MTV Europe Music Awards (EMAs) were established in 1994 by MTV Networks Europe to celebrate the most popular singers and songs in Europe. The MTV Europe Music Awards today is a popular celebration of what MTV viewers consider the best in music. The awards are chosen by MTV viewers. Macklemore & Ryan Lewis have won two awards out of seven nominations.

Year	Nominee / work	Award	Result
2013	"Thrift Shop"	Best Song	Nominated
2013	Macklemore & Ryan Lewis	Best New Artist	Won
2013	Macklemore & Ryan Lewis	Best Hip-Hop Artist	Nominated
2013	Macklemore & Ryan Lewis	Best World Stage Performance	Nominated
2013	Macklemore & Ryan Lewis	Best US Act	Nominated
2015	Macklemore & Ryan Lewis	Best Look	Nominated
2015	"Downtown"	Best Video	Won

=== MTV Video Music Awards ===
The MTV Video Music Awards (commonly abbreviated as VMA) were established in 1984 by the cable channel MTV to honor the top music videos of the year. Macklemore & Ryan Lewis have won three awards out of six nominations.

Year	Nominee / work	Award	Result
2013	"Thrift Shop"	Video of the Year	Nominated
2013	"Can't Hold Us"	Best Hip-Hop Video	Won
2013	"Can't Hold Us"	Best Cinematography	Won
2013	"Can't Hold Us"	Best Direction	Nominated
2013	"Can't Hold Us"	Best Editing	Nominated
2013	"Same Love"	Best Video with a Social Message	Won

=== MTV Video Music Awards Japan ===
The MTV Video Music Awards Japan is the Japanese version of the MTV Video Music Awards. n this event artists are awarded for their songs and videos through online voting from channel viewers. Macklemore & Ryan Lewis have received one nomination.

Year	Nominee / work	Award	Result
2014	Same Love	Best Hip-Hop Video	Nominated

=== mtvU Woodie Awards ===
Year	Nominee / work	Award	Result	Ref.
2013	Macklemore & Ryan Lewis	Branching Out Woodie	Won	
2015	"Arrows" (with Fences)	Co-Sign Woodie	Nominated	

== MuchMusic Video Awards ==
The MuchMusic Video Awards are annual awards presented by the Canadian music video channel MuchMusic to honor the year's best music videos. Macklemore & Ryan Lewis have won one award out of two nominations.

Year	Nominee / work	Award	Result
2013	"Thrift Shop"	International Video of the Year - Group	Won
2014	"White Walls"	International Video of the Year - Group	Nominated
2016	Macklemore & Ryan Lewis	Most Buzzworthy International Artist or Group	Nominated
2016	Macklemore & Ryan Lewis	iHeartRadio International Artist or Group	Won
2016	Macklemore & Ryan Lewis	Fan Fav International Artist or Group	Nominated

== Nickelodeon Kids' Choice Awards ==
The Nickelodeon Kids' Choice Awards, also known as the KCAs or Kids Choice Awards, is an annual awards show that airs on the Nickelodeon cable channel, that honors the year's biggest television, movie, and music acts, as voted by Nickelodeon viewers. Macklemore & Ryan Lewis have received two nominations.

Year	Nominee / work	Award	Result
2014	Macklemore & Ryan Lewis	Favorite Music Group	Nominated
2016	"Downtown"	Favorite Collaboration	Nominated

== NRJ Music Awards ==
The NRJ Music Awards were created in 2000 by the radio station NRJ in a partnership with the television network TF1. They give out awards to popular musicians by different categories. Macklemore and Ryan Lewis have received two nominations.

Year	Nominee / work	Award	Result
2014	Macklemore & Ryan Lewis	International Duo/Group of the Year	Nominated
2014	Macklemore & Ryan Lewis	International Breakthrough of the Year	Nominated

== O Music Awards ==
Year	Nominee / work	Award	Result
2013	Macklemore & Ryan Lewis	Best Web-Born Artist	Nominated

== People's Choice Awards ==
The People's Choice Awards]] is an American awards show established in 1974 that recognizes the people and the work of popular culture, and is voted on by the general public. Macklemore & Ryan Lewis have won one award.

Year	Nominee / work	Award	Result
2014	Macklemore & Ryan Lewis	Favorite Hip Hop Artist	Won

== Teen Choice Awards ==
The Teen Choice Awards were established in 1999 to honor the years biggest achievements in music. movies, sports, and television, as voted by young people aged between 13 and 19 years. Macklemore & Ryan Lewis have won two out of five nominations.

Year	Nominee / work	Award	Result
2013	Macklemore & Ryan Lewis	Choice Music: Hip-Hop/Rap Artist	Won
2013	Macklemore & Ryan Lewis	Choice Music: Breakout Group	Nominated
2013	Macklemore & Ryan Lewis	Choice Summer Music Star: Group	Nominated
2013	"Can't Hold Us"	Choice Music: R&B/Hip-Hop Track	Won
2013	"Thrift Shop"	Choice Music: Single By A Group	Nominated
