= Heroes (Macklemore song) =

2023 single by Macklemore featuring DJ Premier

Single by Macklemore featuring DJ Premier

from the album Ben
- Released: January 20, 2023
- Genre: Hip hop
- Length: 2:55
- Label: Bendo
- Songwriters: Ben Haggerty; Joshua Karp; Christopher Martin; Rawlings; Terrence B. Cole
- Producers: Budo; Tyler Dopps

Macklemore singles chronology
"Faithful" (2022)	"Heroes" (2023)	"No Bad Days" (2023)

Music video
- "Heroes" on YouTube

"Heroes" is a song by American rapper Macklemore featuring American DJ DJ Premier. It was released on January 20, 2023, as the fourth single from Macklemore's third solo studio album Ben (2023). The song was produced by Budo and Tyler Dopps.

== Composition ==
The song contains boom-bap production, over which Macklemore recounts his childhood inspirations and role models, including criminals and rappers. At one point, he compares the experience of watching Frozen with his kids to watching Menace II Society when he was a child. Macklemore also pays homage to DJ Quik and N.W.A. as his idols, claiming to have first heard the latter when he was seven years old. DJ Premier raps in the chorus.

== Music video ==
The music video was directed by Macklemore and Jake Magraw, and released alongside the single. It finds Macklemore in New York City, where he raps on graffiti-filled rooftops and in front of a bodega.
