= Chant (song) =

2022 single by Macklemore and Tones and I

Single by Macklemore and Tones and I

from the album Ben
- Released: July 22, 2022
- Genre: Hip hop
- Length: 4:30
- Label: Bendo
- Songwriters: Ben Haggerty; Joshua Karp; Tyler Andrews; Tyler Dopps; Andrew Joslyn; Josephine Howell
- Producers: Budo; Macklemore

Macklemore singles chronology
"Next Year" (2021)	"Chant" (2022)	"Maniac" (2022)

Tones and I singles chronology
"Eyes Don't Lie" (2022)	"Chant" (2022)	"Charlie" (2022)

Music video
- "Chant" on YouTube

"Chant" is a song by American rapper Macklemore and Australian singer Tones and I, released on July 22, 2022 as the lead single from the former's third solo studio album Ben (2023). It was produced by Budo and Macklemore.

== Background ==
Macklemore told Good Morning America, "'Chant' is about the human spirit, it's about resilience, it's about facing fear, pushing through, and reminding yourself and the world who you really are." In an interview with Rolling Stone, he said "This song is a bit of a rebirth. I wanted to challenge myself, get through moments of writer's block, and capture the spirit of what it's like to overcome something, push through it, and get up the next day and do it again."

Macklemore started teasing the song on July 6, 2022, posting the cover art on Instagram. He shared snippets of the song via TikTok and Instagram before finally releasing it on July 22.

== Composition ==
"Chant" is a gospel-inflected song over a piano instrumental. Lyrically, Macklemore reflects on key moments in his past, including his near-fatal drug overdose in 2020, and his deepest insecurities, while insisting he will not retire from rapping. In the chorus, Tones and I sings about fighting, rising up and not dying. From there, the instrumental uses a thumping beat with a piano riff. In addition, Macklemore discusses bringing Seattle SuperSonics back to the NBA and highlights his music teaching program, the Residency.

== Music video ==
The music video was co-directed by Macklemore and Jake Magraw, and released alongside the single. It begins with Macklemore rising out of a misty lake, and features cameos from NBA stars Jamal Crawford and Isaiah Thomas.

== Charts ==
Chart performance for "Chant"
Chart (2022–2023)	Peak position
Australia (ARIA)	81
Canada Digital Songs (Billboard)	29
New Zealand Hot Singles (RMNZ)	8
US Digital Song Sales (Billboard)	31
