= Maniac (Macklemore song) =

2022 single by Macklemore featuring Windser

Single by Macklemore featuring Windser

from the album Ben
- Released: August 19, 2022
- Length: 3:00
- Label: Bendo
- Songwriters: Ben Haggerty; Joshua Karp; Tyler Andrews; Jordan Topf; Brian Wall; Ryan Lewis
- Producers: Budo; Wall; Lewis

Macklemore singles chronology
"Chant" (2022)	"Maniac" (2022)	"Faithful" (2022)

Windser singles chronology
"Friends I Barely Know" (2022)	"Maniac" (2022)	"Capsize" (2022)

Music video
- "Maniac" on YouTube

"Maniac" is a song by American rapper Macklemore featuring singer Windser. It was released on August 19, 2022 as the second single from the former's third solo studio album Ben (2023) and produced by Budo, Brian Wall and Ryan Lewis. The song is the second collaboration between the artists, following their song "Next Year" (2021).

== Background ==
Macklemore said of the song:

The first time I heard Windser singing the hook on "Maniac" I fell in love with it. It's infectious and relatable and I couldn't get it out of my head. "Maniac" is about the euphoria of a relationship that isn't perfect, but an addictive journey of the ups and downs that make you both who you are.

== Composition and lyrics ==
"Maniac" has been described as a pop track with rapped verses from Macklemore, as well as a sung chorus from Windser: "I don't wanna dance with a maniac / 'Cause the moment we touch, it's a heart attack / You know I love you, honey, but you got me running, yeah / I could give a damn, you're a maniac / And you're talking like a killer, got me on my back / You know I love you, honey, but you got me running, yeah".

== Music video ==
The music video was directed by Jake Magraw and released alongside the single. It pays homage to the video of "Hey Ya!" by Outkast, finding Macklemore dressed in a green suit and dancing in a similar fashion to that of André 3000 as seen in the aforementioned video. It also features a cameo from music journalist Nardwuar and Eva Walker of The Black Tones, who dances and shows off a pearl-white bass.

== Live performances ==
On September 8, 2022, Macklemore and Windser performed the song on Jimmy Kimmel Live!.

== Charts ==
Chart performance for "Maniac"
Chart (2022)	Peak position
New Zealand Hot Singles (RMNZ)	32
Switzerland Airplay (Schweizer Hitparade)	56
