= Mainland (band) =

American band

- Origin: New York, New York
- Genres: post-punk, pop
- Years active: 2011–2019
- Label: 300 Entertainment
- Members: Jordan Topf (vocals, guitar); Corey Mullee (guitar, synth); Alex Pitta (bass)
- Past members: Dylan Longstreet (drums)

Mainland was an American post-punk/rock band based in Brooklyn, New York. The current members are Jordan Topf, Corey Mullee, and Alex Pitta.

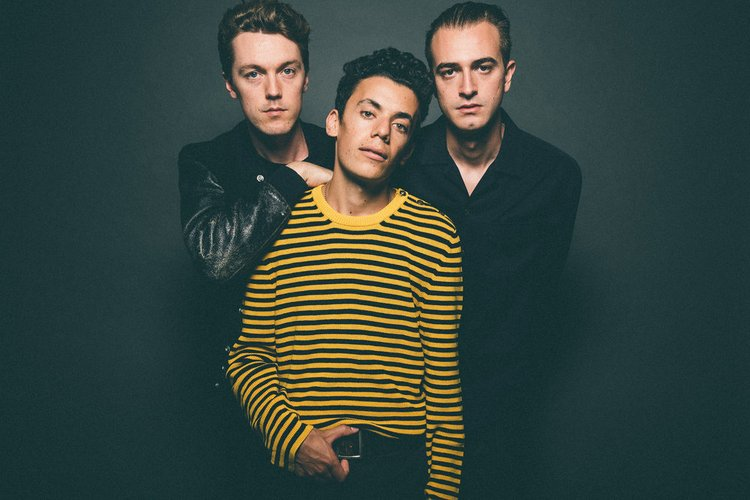
Mainland by Jabari Jacobs

== Background ==
=== 2011-2015 ===
Members Corey and Jordan first met at a party, Jordan being in another band at the time. After leaving his former band, he reconnected with Corey to form Mainland. Alex worked at restaurant with Jordan and joined shortly after. The band’s name comes from a word Topf first heard used by his mother, who spoke of missing the mainland of California where she grew up. Said Topf, “It felt fitting for our story and how we met in New York City. There tends to always be a sense of nostalgia and longing in our music whether it be about a place or a person.”

=== 2015-present ===
In December 2015, Mainland released a 4-song EP titled Outcast under 300 Entertainment, the record label which they signed with earlier that year. The EP was recorded at Sound City in Los Angeles released exclusively through Billboard. They toured with Canadian band Marianas Trench from January–February 2016. They were the opening act for Jukebox the Ghost in February 2016, and the opening act for Melanie Martinez's Cry Baby tour. In June 2016, they released their single "Beggars" followed by a stream of self-produced singles “Permission Slip”, “Empty Promises”, and “Dummy Test”. On April 28, 2018, the band released a 5-song EP titled Villains under 300 Entertainment. It included singles "I Found God" and “Hometown". On May 22, 2019, Mainland collaborated with Rynx for the release of his fourth single, “Read My Mind.”
The band played their final show on January 25, 2019 at The Satellite in Los Angeles, California. The band went dormant the years following as singer Jordan Topf went solo as Windser and announced on X their official split in 2022.

== Notable Features ==
Mainland’s single "Not As Cool As Me" was featured on Shake Shack's Shack 10 playlist on Spotify, which features 10 popular songs playing in locations each month.

== Influences ==
Collectively, Mainland's influences include British bands such as The Cure, Depeche Mode, New Order, and The La's. In Jordan Topf’s words, "We love the way those bands mask well-crafted pop songs with poignant lyrics." Mainland also lists Michael Jackson, The Velvet Underground, and The Clash as artists that inspire them.

== Discography ==
- Shiner EP (2014)
- Outcast EP (2015)
- Beggars (2016)
- Permission Slip (2016)
- Empty Promises (2016)
- Dummy Test (2016)
- I Found God (2017)
- Hometown (2018)
- Villains EP (2018)
