= Faithful (Macklemore song) =

2022 single by Macklemore featuring NLE Choppa

Single by Macklemore featuring NLE Choppa

from the album Ben
- Released: October 28, 2022
- Length: 3:27
- Label: Bendo
- Songwriters: Ben Haggerty; Joshua Karp; Tyler Andrews; Tyler Dopps; Bryson Potts
- Producer: Budo

Macklemore singles chronology
"Maniac" (2022)	"Faithful" (2022)	"Heroes" (2023)

NLE Choppa singles chronology
"Do It Again" (2022)	"Faithful" (2022)	"Ice Spice" (2022)

Music video
- "Faithful" on YouTube

"Faithful" is a song by American rapper Macklemore, released on October 28, 2022 as the third single from his third solo studio album Ben (2023). It features American rapper NLE Choppa and was produced by Budo.

== Background ==
Macklemore has been open with his past drug abuse and addiction, including in music. In 2020, due to social isolation during the COVID-19 pandemic, he relapsed and nearly died of an overdose. According to him, he wrote the song shortly after that. In an interview with Billboard, Macklemore also stated his wife was integral in his decision for it to be a single. As for his collaboration with NLE Choppa, Macklemore said:

He brought the song into his world, writing from the perspective of a supportive friend and showing up in a desperate time. I thought the song would push him out of his comfort zone, but honestly he sounded right at home in the pocket and brought a whole new concept to the record. It's been refreshing spending some time with him. I'm hella impressed not only by his pen, but his perspective on life and quest for spiritual growth.

== Composition ==
The instrumental of the song, made up of plucked synths and a theremin, has been described as "relatively restrained and upbeat". Lyrically, Macklemore discusses his personal struggles with drug abuse and addiction, and their impact on his mental health. In the first verse, he reflects on his friendships that ended early, including one with rapper Mac Miller, who died from an overdose in 2018. Macklemore further addresses feeling abandoned, facing his inner thoughts and need for Alcoholics Anonymous. NLE Choppa conveys a message that there is hope for any person struggling with addiction in his verse, noting he and Macklemore both have daughters they should not disappoint and also rapping about considering the effects of one's actions.

== Music video ==
The music video was directed by John Peterson and released on November 3, 2022. It begins with Macklemore driving to and entering a cabin, where encounters a presumed demon. NLE Choppa appears at a diner.
