= The Physics (group) =

American hip hop group

- Origin: Seattle, Washington
- Genres: Hip hop; Northwest hip hop
- Years active: 1998–present
- Members: Thig Nat; Monk Wordsmith; Justo
- Website: thephysicsmusic.com

The Physics is an American hip hop group based in Seattle, Washington. It was created in the late-1990s when its members, Thig Natural (Gathigi Gishuru), Monk Wordsmith (Njuguna Gishuru) and Just D'Amato (Justin Hare) were students at O'Dea High School in Seattle. Since 2007, the trio has released three full-length albums, two EPs and several non-album singles.

The Physics are an integral part of the Seattle hip hop community, and much of their music is centered on life in Seattle ("Seward Park" and "Coronas on Madrona," for example). They are known for rapping about everyman themes such as romance, working 9-5 jobs, and enjoying life.

== Members ==
The Physics consists of two MCs, real-life brothers Thig Natural (often referred to as Thig Nat), and Monk Wordsmith (who functions as the group's hype man as well) and producer, Justo. All three members grew up in a neighborhood known as Seattle's South End. Thig and Monk are first-generation Americans of Kenyan descent, and Just D'Amato (also known as Justo) is half-Filipino. The Physics reference their heritage in their music, especially in the Tomorrow People track, "Journey of the Drum." Thig is also a photographer who shoots primarily fashion and street photography.

Their music frequently features other artists from hip-hop and other genres. They have collaborated with R&B singers Mario and Malice Sweet, producer Jake One, and Phonte, THEESatisfaction, Macklemore, Grynch, Sol, Bambu, Dave B, Blue Scholars and more. In recent years, they have recorded and performed with a live band including trumpeter Owuor Arunga, guitarist Eben Haase, keyboardist Sam Wishkoski, and Mario and Malice Sweet’s backup vocals.

== Distribution ==
The Physics’ three albums, Future Talk, Love Is a Business and Tomorrow People have all been self-released, as have their free EPs and singles. The Physics' most recent album, Tomorrow People, was funded through Kickstarter. The crowd funding campaign raised $11,721 from 242 backers – surpassing a goal of $8,000. The project appeared on Kickstarter's "Staff Picks" and "Popular" pages in July and August 2012.

== Critical reception and role in the Seattle scene ==
The Physics' sound has been synonymous with "Seattle summers," for many, due to its hyperlocal lyrics and laid back, upbeat vibe. "You could hardly imagine better ambassadors of our deep, watery homegrown flow," wrote The Stranger's Larry Mizell Jr. in a 2012 review. Seattle Weekly writer Todd Hamm wrote, The Physics' most recent album, Tomorrow People, transcends local hip hop to a broader appeal. "Their vibe is positive, their production is intricate and well-finished, and they reach a rare-level of professionalism with each release." The Seattle Times named Love Is a Business one of the Top 10 local albums of 2011. Radio station 90.3 KEXP ranked Tomorrow People on its "DJ's Top 10 Lists of 2012."

Three Piece was named Seattle Weekly's "Best Free EP To Light Up Your Summer" in 2010. Love is a Business LP ranked No.1 on KEXP’s hip hop and variety charts for eight weeks each, and Tomorrow People LP hit No. 1 on KEXP's hip hop charts for all of August 2012.

== Performances and Tours ==
The Physics have performed at Seattle's Bumbershoot festival in 2008 and 2010, and the Capitol Hill Block Party music festival in 2008 and 2010. They played at South By Southwest in Austin, Texas in March 2011, and at Sasquatch! Music Festival at the Gorge Amphitheatre in May 2012. The group opened for Mos Def at CityArts Fest2012.

In late 2011, The Physics toured with Blue Scholars on the Cinémetroplis Tour, ending with a sold-out show at the Bowery Ballroom in New York City. In fall 2012, The Physics launched Tomorrow People Tour, a West Coast tour with The Bar (Prometheus Brown and Bambu) and Grynch. They played shows from Los Angeles to Vancouver, British Columbia. In December 2012 The Physics joined Blue Scholars again on the national Town All Day Tour.

== Discography ==
=== Albums ===
- 2007: Future Talk
- 2011: Love Is a Business
- 2012: Tomorrow People
- 2013: Digital Wildlife
- 2015: Wish You Were Here

=== EPs ===
- 2009: High-Society
- 2010: Three Piece

=== Non-album Singles ===
- 2012: "After Effect (feat. Grynch)"
- 2011: "Fix You"
- 2011: "The Recipe (feat. Craig G)" produced by David Dejesus
