= Drug Dealer (song) =

2016 single by Macklemore featuring Ariana DeBoo

Single by Macklemore featuring Ariana DeBoo
- Released: October 11, 2016
- Genre: Conscious hip hop
- Length: 3:43
- Songwriters: Ben Haggerty; Ariana DeBoo; Joshua Karp; Joshua Rawlings; John Sinclair; David Takahashi; David Dalton; Tyler Andrews
- Producer: Macklemore

Macklemore singles chronology
"Rio (Remix)" (2016)	"Drug Dealer" (2016)	"Wednesday Morning" (2016)

Ariana DeBoo singles chronology
"Good to Be Home" (2016)	"Drug Dealer" (2016)

Music video
- "Drug Dealer" on YouTube

"Drug Dealer" is a single by American rapper Macklemore featuring American singer Ariana DeBoo, released on October 11, 2016. It was produced by Macklemore.

== Background ==
Macklemore has struggled with drug abuse in the past and publicly spoken about the issue, including in previous songs such as "Otherside". "Drug Dealer" was released in preparation for his discussion with President Barack Obama about the opioid addiction epidemic on the MTV documentary Prescription For Change: Ending America's Opioid Crisis, which aired on the same day of the song's release.

== Composition and lyrics ==
Backed by an instrumental of "subdued piano progression" and "frantic" percussion, the song deals with the themes of drug abuse, and criticizes drug companies (such as Purdue Pharma), their CEOs and business with the Congress, and doctors who overprescribe painkillers for their own profit. In the first verse, Macklemore addresses the political pull of pharmaceutical companies, the drug-related deaths of musicians Prince, Michael Jackson, Whitney Houston, Amy Winehouse, Heath Ledger, Pimp C, ASAP Yams and DJ AM, and the ongoing opioid epidemic in the United States. He also references the song "Can't Feel My Face" by The Weeknd ("And we dancin' to a song about our face goin' numb"). In the chorus, Ariana DeBoo compares a doctor to a drug dealer: "My drug dealer was a doctor, doctor / Had the plug from Big Pharma". Following the hook, Macklemore covers his own struggles with addiction ("Four Horseman, they won't let me forget / I wanna forge a prescription, cause doctor I need some more of it / When morphine and heroin is more viewer budget / I said I'd never use a needle, but sure, fuck it") and the consequences of opioids.

== Music video ==
The music video was released on October 25, 2016. Directed by Jason Koenig, it opens with Macklemore sitting naked and hunched over in a shower as he battles withdrawal symptoms. Throughout the video, he is shown sitting, lying, tossing and turning in a stripped down mattress and sweating, in a room surrounded by drugs; his eyes are swollen and filled with tears. He is also seen chain-smoking cigarettes and vomiting. Ariana DeBoo appears buried in a pile of red and white pills as she sings. The clip ends with Macklemore at a Narcotics Anonymous meeting and hugging others.

== Live performances ==
On November 16, 2016, Macklemore performed the song with Ariana DeBoo and The Roots on The Tonight Show Starring Jimmy Fallon.

== Charts ==
Chart (2016)	Peak position
Canada (Canadian Hot 100)	56
