= Whiskey Blanket =

American hip hop group

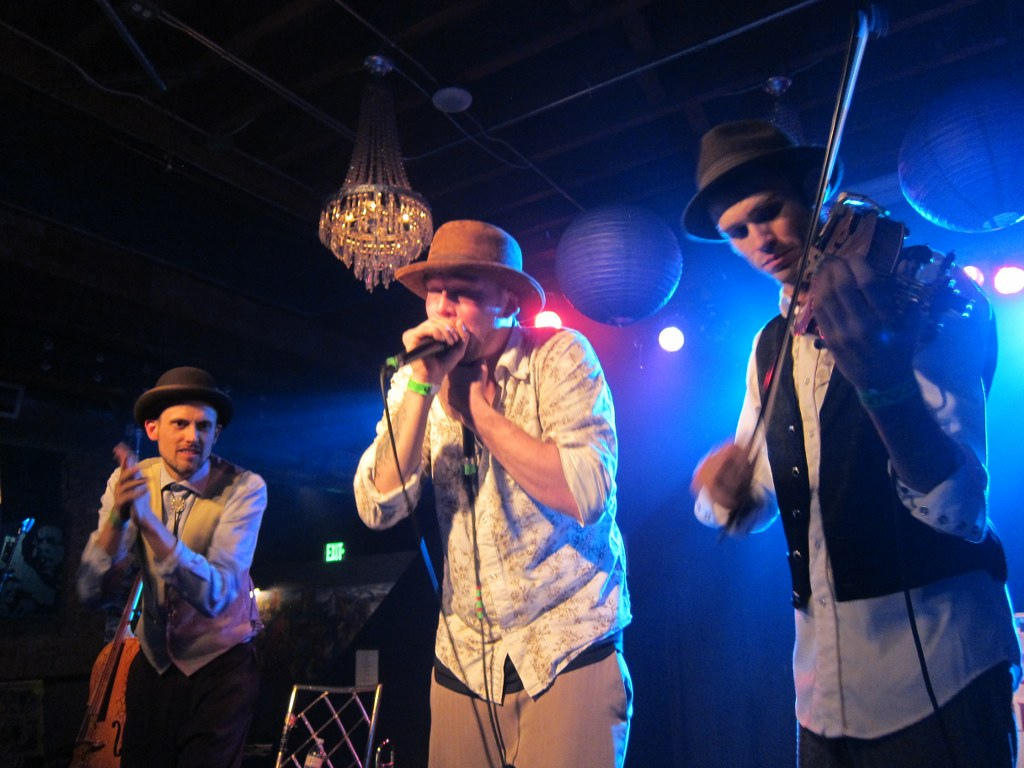
- Whiskey Blanket in 2013

Background information
- Origin: Boulder, Colorado
- Genres: Hip Hop, Rap, Alternative hip hop, Jazz Rap, Classical Rap
- Years active: 2003 – present
- Members: Sloppy Joe; Steakhouse; Funny Biz

Whiskey Blanket is an Alternative hip hop trio from Boulder, Colorado, formed in 2003. The group is made up of emcee and violinist Sloppy Joe (Joe Lessard), emcee and cellist Funny Biz (Jordan Polovina), and emcee, turntableist, and producer Steakhouse (Steven Pampel). All three members are classically trained musicians, and they regularly incorporate live piano, cello, and violin into their performances and recordings, combining elements of Jazz and Classical music with Hip Hop.

== Discography ==
- It's Warmer Down Here (2004)
- Credible Forces (2007)
- No Object (2010)
- Collection I (2012)
- From the Dead of Dark (2014)
- Thick as Thieves (2017)
- Out with the Ark (2023)
