= Windser =

American musician and singer-songwriter

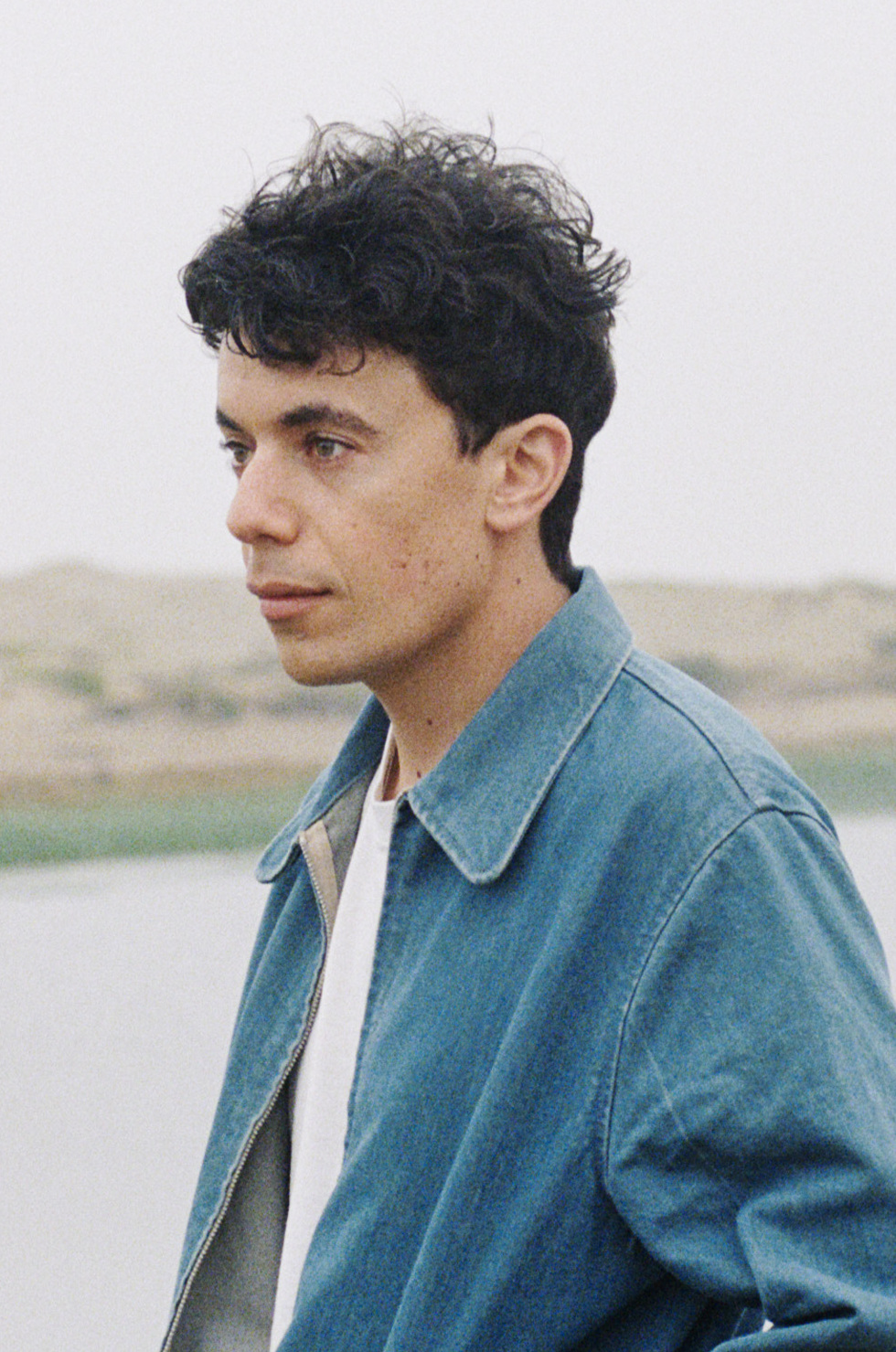
- Windser in 2024

Background information
- Born: Jordan Topf
- Origin: Santa Cruz, California, U.S.
- Genres: Indie pop, indie rock, alternative
- Years active: 2020–present
- Label: Bright Antenna Records
- Website: www.windsermusic.com

Windser is the stage name of American musician, singer-songwriter, and producer Jordan Topf. Based in Los Angeles, California, he gained recognition with his debut EP Where the Redwoods Meet the Sea in 2022 and released his self-titled debut album on May 16, 2025, through Bright Antenna Records. He was previously a member of the group Mainland.

== Early life and career ==
Topf was raised in Santa Cruz, California where he played in punk bands and organized DIY shows at coffee houses and house parties. After high school, he attended The City College of New York where he studied music production and formed his first band, Mainland. The band went on to record with Jim Eno of Spoon and sign to 300 Entertainment. Mainland released a number of singles and EPs before disbanding in 2019. Following the breakup, Topf began writing solo material under the name Windser, inspired by the street he grew up on.

Between 2020 and 2021, Topf wrote and recorded what would become his debut EP, Where the Redwoods Meet the Sea, which was released in 2022. The EP received early radio support from SiriusXM’s Alt Nation and helped establish Windser as a rising artist.

== Collaborations and performances ==
Windser collaborated with rapper Macklemore on the singles "Next Year" (2021) and "Maniac" (2022).

On September 8, 2022, Macklemore and Windser performed "Maniac" on Jimmy Kimmel Live!.

Macklemore praised Windser's performance on the song: “The first time I heard Windser singing the hook on ‘Maniac,’ I fell in love with it. It’s infectious and relatable, and I couldn’t get it out of my head. ‘Maniac’ is about the euphoria of a relationship that isn’t perfect, but an addictive journey of the ups and downs that make you both who you are.”

In 2022, Windser joined alt-J and Portugal. The Man as a supporting act on their North American tour. He has since performed at major festivals including Lollapalooza and BottleRock Napa Valley.

== Chart performance ==
"Maniac" peaked at number 32 on the New Zealand Hot Singles Chart, and reached number 56 on the Swiss Airplay Chart.

== Debut album: Windser (2025) ==
In February 2025, Windser announced his self-titled debut album, released on May 16, 2025, alongside the single “Abandon.” The track draws on themes of childhood trauma and emotional recovery, reflecting the personal tone of the album. The project features production by Matias Tellez and Topf himself, as well as contributions from Dan Bailey, Adam Christgau, Daniel Rhine, Harrison Whitford, and Jerry Borge.

The album received positive coverage from several music publications. Under the Radar praised Windser's storytelling and sonic textures, highlighting the album's introspective themes.

== Discography ==
=== Albums ===
Windser (2025)

=== EPs ===
Where the Redwoods Meet the Sea (2022)

=== Singles ===
- "July" (2020)
- "Next Year" (with Macklemore) (2021)
- "Memory" (2021)
- "Maniac" (with Macklemore) (2022)
- "Get Lost" (2023)
- "TV" (2023)
- "Abandon" (2025)
- "Shut Up and Kiss Me" (2025)
- "These Days" (2025)
- "Lose You" (2025)
