= And We Danced (Macklemore song) =

Single by Macklemore featuring Ziggy Stardust

from the album The Unplanned Mixtape
- Released: First Release (on mixtape): 2009 / Single: October 31, 2011
- Genre: Alternative hip hop
- Length: 4:06
- Label: Macklemore LLC
- Songwriter: Ben Haggerty
- Producer: Ryan Lewis

Macklemore singles chronology
"The Town" (2009)	"And We Danced" (2009)	"Drug Dealer" (2016)

Music video
- "And We Danced" on YouTube

"And We Danced" is a song by Macklemore, under the alter-ego Raven Bowie, and features singer Ziggy Stardust. It was released as a single on October 31, 2011, by Macklemore LLC.

== Background ==
Unlike later releases by Macklemore like "My Oh My", "Wing$", "Same Love", and the major hits "Thrift Shop" and "Can't Hold Us", all taken from Macklemore & Ryan Lewis, this release was taken from his 2009 mixtape, The Unplanned Mixtape, and only credits Macklemore and "Ziggy Stardust". Primarily due to the popularity of the single "Thrift Shop", the song charted in 2013 in Austria, France, Ireland and Switzerland.

== Music video ==
The music video was shot in 2011 and was directed by Griff J and Ryan Lewis. The music video was uploaded to Ryan Lewis's YouTube channel and has over 130 million views as of October 2021. Contrary to the song's own release data, it states Macklemore x Ryan Lewis as the artists.

== Chart performance ==
=== Weekly charts ===
Chart (2013–14)	Peak position
Austria (Ö3 Austria Top 40)	4
Canada Digital Songs (Billboard)	69
France (SNEP)	89
Ireland (IRMA)	67
Slovenia (SloTop50)	43
Switzerland (Schweizer Hitparade)	36

=== Year-end ===
Chart (2013)	Position
Austria (Ö3 Austria Top 40)	10

== Release history ==
Country	Date	Format	Label
United States	October 31, 2011	Digital download	Macklemore LLC.

== Certifications ==
Region	Certification	Certified units/sales
Italy (FIMI)	Gold	25,000^{‡}
Switzerland (IFPI Switzerland)	Gold	15,000^{^}
^{^} Shipments figures based on certification alone.^{‡} Sales+streaming figures based on certification alone.
