= Ryan Lewis =

American musician (born 1988)

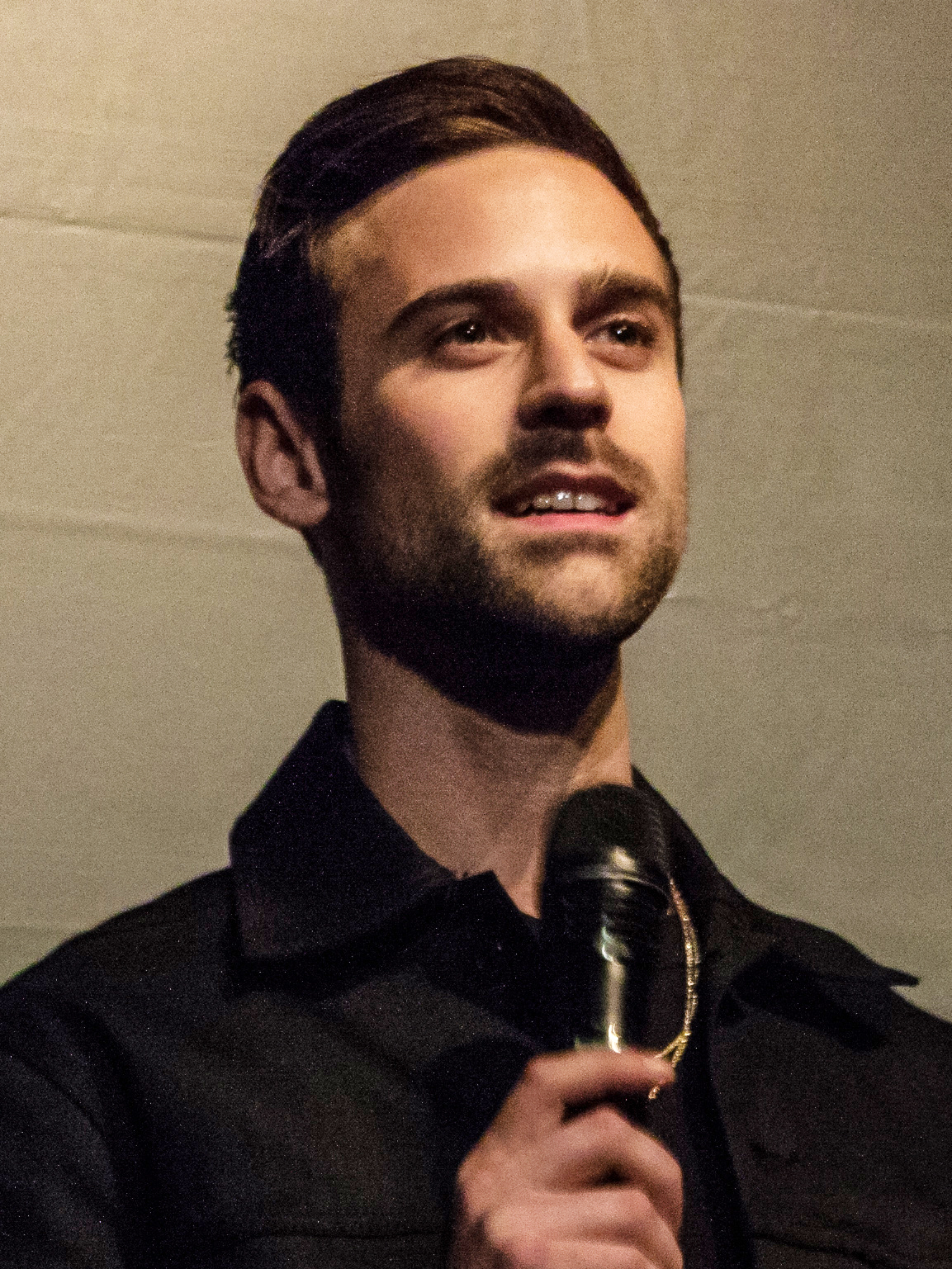
- Lewis performing in 2013

Background information
- Also known as: Duke Goobler
- Born: Ryan Scott Lewis; March 25, 1988 (age 38); Spokane, Washington, U.S.
- Origin: Seattle, Washington, U.S.
- Genre: Hip hop
- Occupations: Record producer; musician; DJ; rapper; songwriter
- Instruments: Keyboards; guitar; programming; turntables; vocals
- Labels: Bendo; Macklemore, LLC; Columbia; Elektra; ADA
- Formerly of: Macklemore & Ryan Lewis
- Website: macklemore.com

Signature
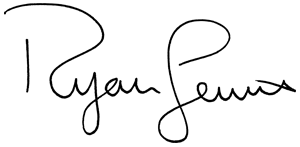

Ryan Scott Lewis (born March 25, 1988) is an American musician and record producer based in Seattle, Washington. Along with producing his own album, Instrumentals, Lewis produced the recordings The VS. EP (2009), The Heist (2012), and This Unruly Mess I've Made (2016) as part of the duo Macklemore & Ryan Lewis. He is the winner of four Grammy awards.

In 2006, Lewis befriended rapper Macklemore on Myspace and soon after became his behind-the-scenes partner, producing, recording, engineering and mixing all of the duo's music and directing the music videos for "Same Love", "Thrift Shop", "And We Danced", "Otherside (Remix)", "Can't Hold Us", "Irish Celebration", "My Oh My", "Victory Lap", "Downtown", "Brad Pitt's Cousin" and "White Walls" and designing promotional graphics. Lewis has also directed 12 Macklemore & Ryan Lewis videos.

== Early life ==
Lewis was born in Spokane, Washington, to Julie and Scott Lewis. Lewis has two sisters, Teresa and Laura, four years and two years older than he is, respectively. At an early age, he played guitar in rock bands with his childhood best friend Ryan Sanson, and nursed a growing interest in music production around the age of 15. Lewis attended Ferris High School in Spokane and graduated from Roosevelt High School in Seattle. He graduated from the University of Washington majoring in Comparative History of Ideas.

== Career ==
=== 2006–2008: Career beginnings ===
Lewis became a professional photographer and videographer. In 2008, he released his debut extended play, Instrumentals, with four alternative hip hop songs. In the same year, Lewis collaborated with Rhode Island–based emcee Symmetry in a self-titled work, released as an LP.

=== 2009–present: Career with Macklemore ===
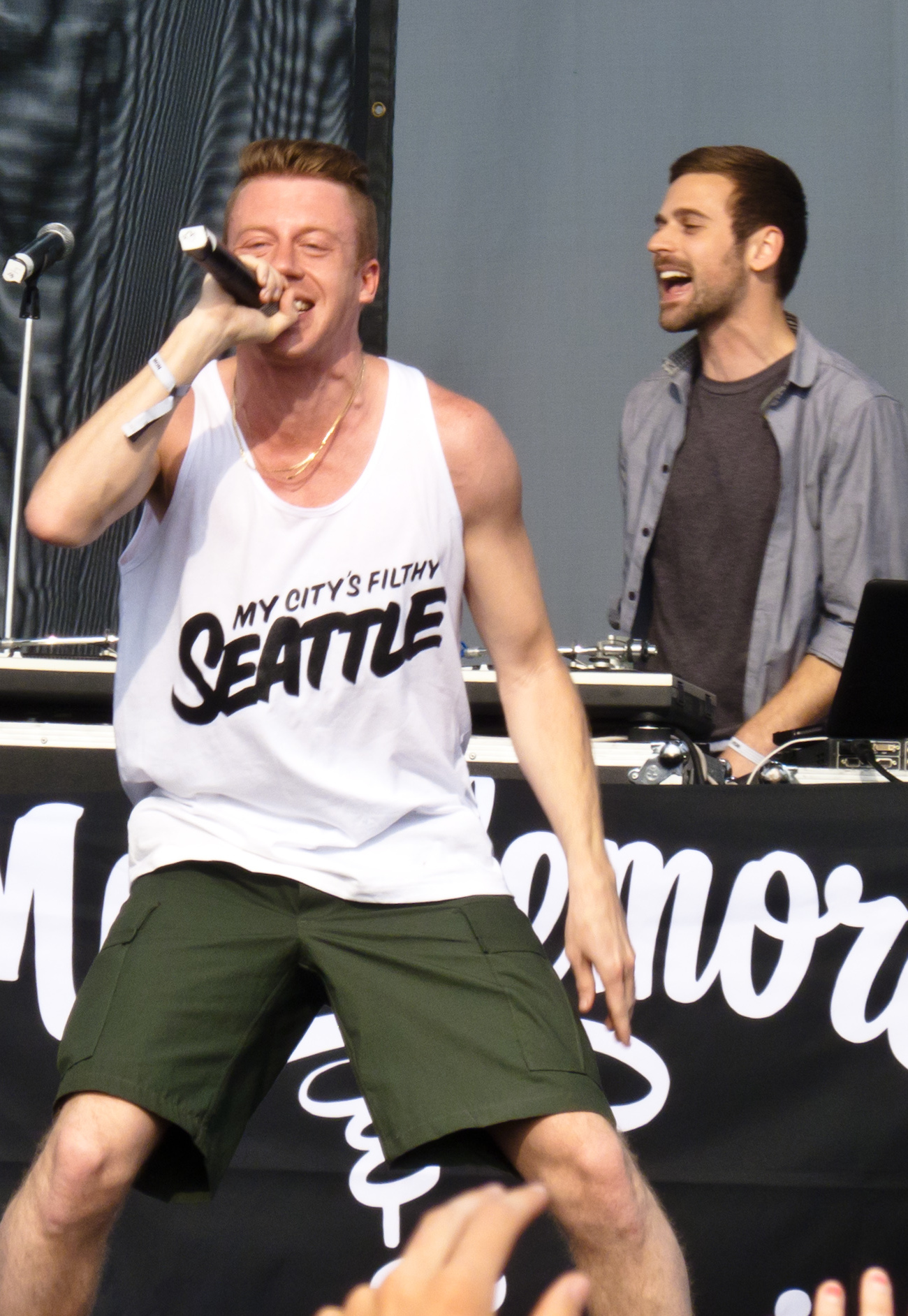
Ryan Lewis with Macklemore at Sasquatch! Music Festival, in 2012

Lewis first met Macklemore in 2006, but only in 2009 did they formalize the collaboration as the duo Macklemore & Ryan Lewis and release the EP The VS. EP.

In October 2010, Lewis produced the VS. Redux EP and, in December, their debut single, "My Oh My". "Wings" was released on January 21, 2011, followed by "Can't Hold Us" featuring Ray Dalton on August 16, 2011.

Their album The Heist was released in October 2012. Previously released singles "My Oh My", "Wings", and "Can't Hold Us" were announced to be included on the album – as was the song "Make the Money". "Can't Hold Us" was used as soundtrack for a Miller beer ad in UK and Ireland in June 2012. "Same Love" was released on July 18, 2012, and songs "White Walls" featuring Schoolboy Q and "Jimmy Iovine" featuring Ab-Soul were confirmed to be included on the album. The Heist debuted on the US Billboard 200 at number two.

At the 56th Annual Grammy Awards, Lewis and Macklemore were nominated for seven awards and won four: Best New Artist, Best Rap Album (The Heist), Best Rap Performance and Best Rap Song (both for "Thrift Shop").

On October 30, 2012, Lewis appeared on The Ellen DeGeneres Show performing their single "Same Love" and then again on January 18, 2013, performing their single "Thrift Shop", which they had sung previously on Late Night with Jimmy Fallon on December 11, 2012. The song topped the Billboard Hot 100 for six weeks, giving them their first number 1 hit in the US.

The Heist World Tour began in August 2012 to promote The Heist.

On January 26, 2014, Macklemore performed "Same Love" at the 56th Annual Grammy Awards, where Queen Latifah read marriage vows for 33 couples who lined the aisles, including Lewis's sister, Laura, and her now husband.

In January 2015, Lewis announced via Twitter that his third studio album would be released sometime in the second half of the year. On August 5, 2015, Macklemore released a song for free download titled "Growing Up (Sloane's Song)", which features Ed Sheeran.

On August 27, 2015, the duo released "Downtown", featuring Eric Nally, Kool Moe Dee, Melle Mel, and Grandmaster Caz; it was performed at the 2015 MTV Video Music Awards on August 30. "Downtown" is part of their album, This Unruly Mess I've Made, which was released on February 26, 2016.

On January 22, 2016, the duo released "White Privilege II", the second single on This Unruly Mess I've Made. On June 15, 2017, Macklemore announced via his official Instagram that the duo were on hiatus. In 2021, Lewis helped produced the new Macklemore single "Next Year". He also wrote or helped produce two tracks on the 2023 Macklemore album Ben, including the single "Maniac".

=== Other works ===
July 2017 saw the release of Kesha's song "Praying", which Lewis co-wrote and produced. Also in 2017, Lewis co-wrote and co-produced "The Greatest Show," the opening track from The Greatest Showman's soundtrack. The song, which also featured contributions from Benj Pasek, Justin Paul, Greg Wells, Jake Sinclair, and Alex Lacamoire.

On August 19, 2019, Hobo Johnson's song "Subaru Crosstrek XV" was released, which Lewis co-wrote and produced.

In April 2022, Audiochuck launched The Deck, a true crime podcast for which Lewis wrote the theme music. Audiochuck released a video documenting behind-the-scenes of Lewis making the track.

== Discography ==
=== Studio albums ===
Title	Album details
Symmetry and Ryan Lewis (with Symmetry)	Released: May 6, 2008; Format: LP, digital download; Label: Independent

=== Extended plays ===
Title	Album details
Instrumentals	Released: 2008; Format: Digital download; Label: Independent

=== Remixes ===
- "Vipassana (Ryan Lewis Remix)" by Macklemore & Ryan Lewis; from the VS. Redux EP
- "Otherside (Ryan Lewis Remix)" by Macklemore & Ryan Lewis featuring Fences; from VS. Redux

== See also ==
- List of awards and nominations received by Macklemore & Ryan Lewis
