= Macklemore =

American rapper (born 1983)

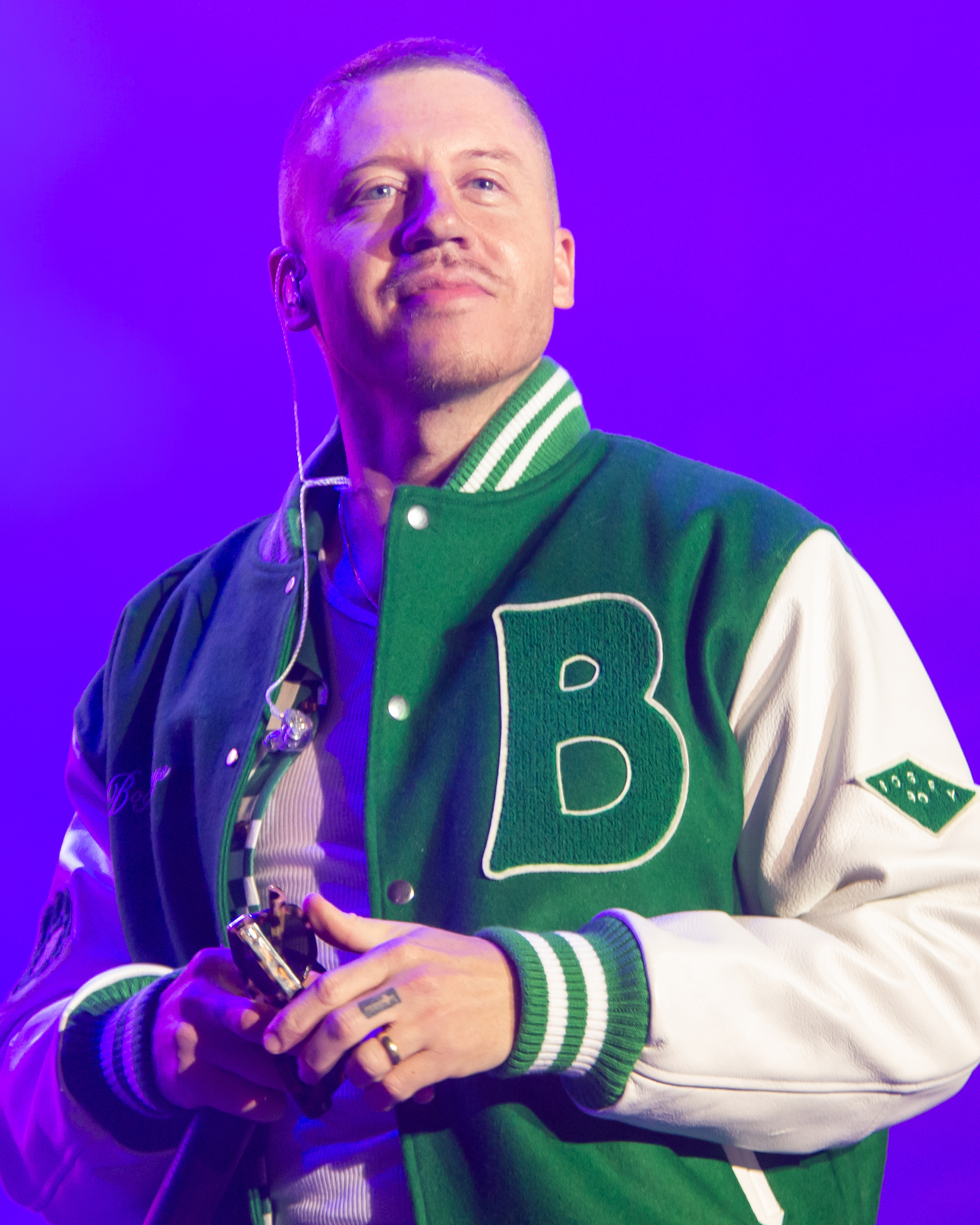
- Macklemore in 2022
- Born: Benjamin Hammond Haggerty; June 19, 1983 (age 43); Seattle, Washington, U.S.
- Other name: Professor Macklemore
- Education: College of Santa Fe; Evergreen State College (BA)
- Occupations: Rapper; singer; songwriter
- Years active: 2000–present
- Spouse: Tricia Davis (m. 2015)
- Children: 3
- Awards: Full list
- Musical career
- Genres: Hip-hop; alternative hip-hop; pop rap
- Works: Discography; Macklemore & Ryan Lewis discography
- Labels: Bendo; ADA
- Formerly of: Macklemore & Ryan Lewis
- Website: macklemore.com

Signature
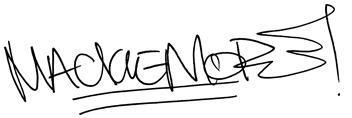

Benjamin Hammond Haggerty (born June 19, 1983), better known by his stage name Macklemore (/ˈmækləmɔːr/ MAK-lə-mor; formerly Professor Macklemore), is an American rapper. A native of Seattle, Washington, he started his career in 2000 as an independent artist releasing Open Your Eyes (2000), The Language of My World (2005), and The Unplanned Mixtape (2009). He rose to international success collaborating with producer Ryan Lewis as the duo Macklemore & Ryan Lewis (2009–2016).

Macklemore & Ryan Lewis's 2012 single "Thrift Shop" (featuring Wanz) became the first self-released song to top the Billboard Hot 100 in 11 years. Their second single, "Can't Hold Us" (featuring Ray Dalton), also peaked on chart, making Macklemore and Lewis the first duo in the chart's history to have their first two singles both reach the peak position. Their debut studio album The Heist (2012) peaked at number 2 on the U.S. Billboard 200. The duo entered into a slightly unusual three-month, one-album contract with Warner Bros.'s independent distribution arm ADA, which allowed them to retain control over their intellectual property and maintain their "artistic integrity". At the 56th Annual Grammy Awards, the duo won Best New Artist, Best Rap Album (The Heist), Best Rap Song ("Same Love") and Best Rap Performance ("Thrift Shop"). The duo's second album, This Unruly Mess I've Made (2016), followed thereafter.

In June 2017, Macklemore released the single "Glorious" (featuring Skylar Grey), which marked his return to the music industry as well as his first major single produced without Lewis since his mainstream breakthrough. Macklemore released his second solo studio album, Gemini, in September of that year, peaking at number 2 on the Billboard 200. On March 3, 2023, he released his third album Ben, which peaked at number 18.

== Early life and influences ==
Benjamin Hammond Haggerty was born on June 19, 1983, in Seattle, Washington, one of two sons born to Bill Haggerty and Julie Schott. He was raised with his brother Tim in Seattle's Capitol Hill neighborhood. He has Irish heritage and was raised Catholic. Haggerty was six years old when hip-hop first came into his life by way of Digital Underground. At age fifteen, he began to write lyrics.

At the time he started to sing, Haggerty listened to "a lot of East Coast underground hip hop", listing Hieroglyphics, Freestyle Fellowship, Aceyalone, Living Legends, Wu-Tang Clan, Mobb Deep, Nas, and Talib Kweli as his major influences. Haggerty attended Garfield High School and Nathan Hale High School. At Hale, he developed the stage name "Professor Macklemore" for an art project involving a made-up superhero, and at Garfield, he started a hip-hop group named Elevated Elements with other students. The group released an album, Progress, in 2000.

Haggerty enrolled at the College of Santa Fe for a year, later saying in an interview that "[i]t was a very pivotal time in a lot of ways. Santa Fe was the place where I got good at rapping". After not getting into the music program, he moved back to Seattle. Haggerty later enrolled at Evergreen State College in Olympia and completed his bachelor's degree in 2009. While at Evergreen, he was interested in reaching a younger generation through his music. He became part of a program focusing on education and cultural identity called "Gateways for Incarcerated Youth", where he facilitated music workshops.

== Career ==
=== 2000–2008: The Language of My World ===
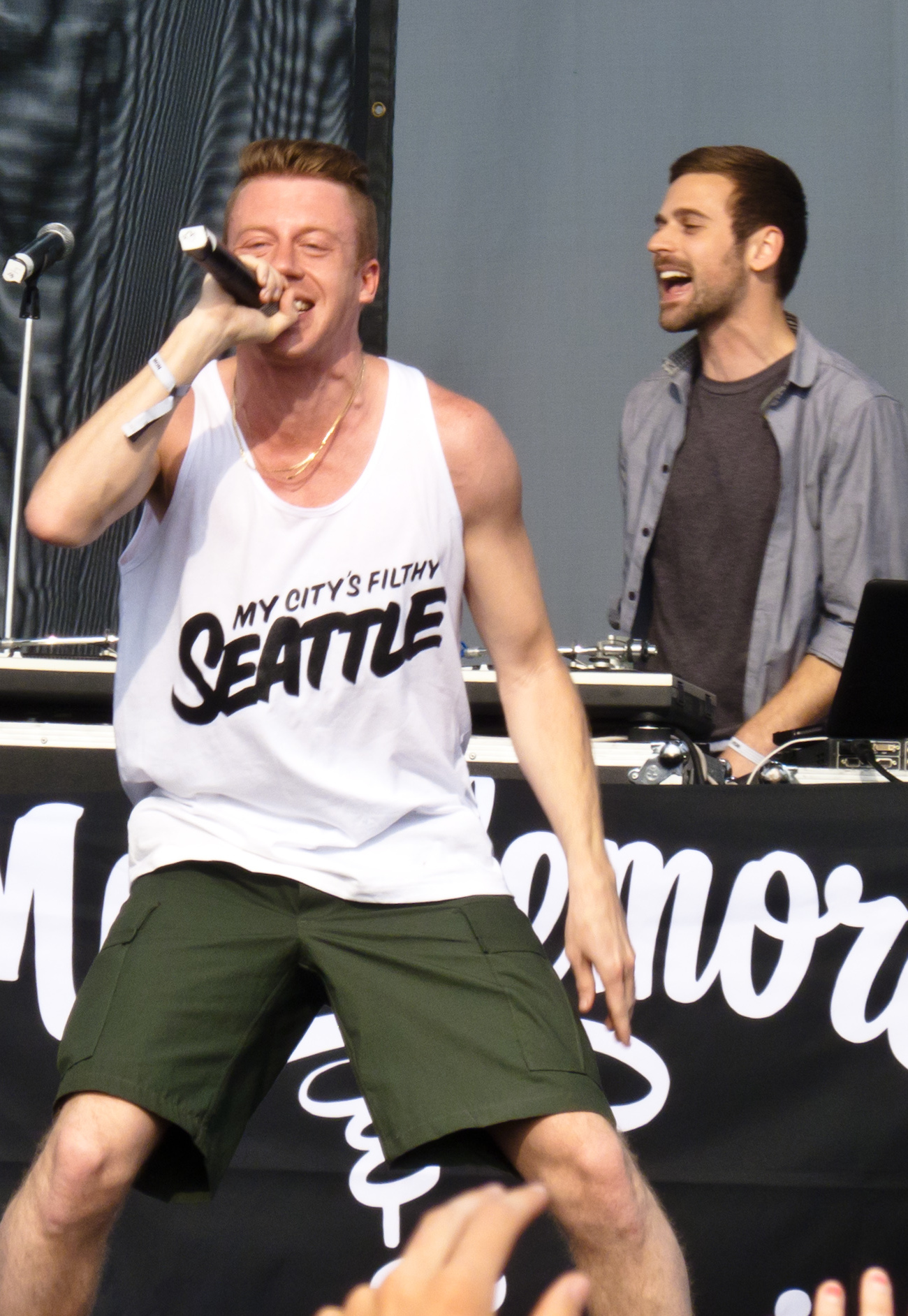
Macklemore & Ryan Lewis at Sasquatch! Music Festival (2011)

In 2000, Haggerty recorded a mixtape titled Open Your Eyes under the name Professor Macklemore, which he distributed himself and released on October 21, 2000. Haggerty dropped "Professor" from his name and began working on his first official full-length album, called The Language of My World. The album was released on January 1, 2005, with its lead single, "Love Song", being announced the same day. "Love Song" featured singer Evan Roman, and was produced by Budo, who would later go on to produce several more tracks for Macklemore.

In 2006, Haggerty first met his future collaborator Ryan Lewis. Lewis, who would go on to release two albums with Haggerty as Macklemore & Ryan Lewis, spent a few years working on Macklemore's promotion as a photographer. The two musicians would soon become good friends but would not formalize their collaborative efforts until 2009. In the meantime, Macklemore kept busy as a solo artist, appearing on The Physics's song "Good" in 2009, as well as performing at the Seattle major arts and music festival Bumbershoot in 2006, 2009, and 2011.

Macklemore's second mixtape, The Unplanned Mixtape, was released on September 7, 2009, reaching No. 7 on the iTunes Hip Hop chart. The mixtape was accompanied by the singles "The Town" and "And We Danced", the latter of which featured singer Ziggy Stardust. "The Town" was later remixed by Sabzi of the Blue Scholars.

=== 2009–2017: Career with Ryan Lewis ===
In 2009, Macklemore and Ryan Lewis formalized their collaboration as the duo Macklemore & Ryan Lewis. They released the EP The VS. EP. They also released "Irish Celebration" in December 2009 in anticipation of the release of The Vs. EP. In March 2010, the duo released "Stay At Home Dad", a track that "didn't quite make" Vs. In October 2010, they created the VS. Redux EP. Macklemore used his experience with substance abuse to create the mixtape's song "Otherside", which samples the Red Hot Chili Peppers song of the same title. On April 8, 2011, Macklemore and Ryan Lewis performed the song at the 2011 Mariners Opening Day in front of a sold-out crowd of nearly 48,000 attendees. "Wings" was released on January 21, 2011, followed by "Can't Hold Us" (featuring Ray Dalton) on August 16, 2011. In February 2011, Macklemore and Lewis kicked off a multi-city tour in Seattle, which included three sold-out shows at the Showbox at the Market music venue. That same year, the rapper appeared at many U.S. music festivals, including Bumbershoot, Outside Lands, Lollapalooza, Rock the Bells, Soundset, Sasquatch, and Bonnaroo.

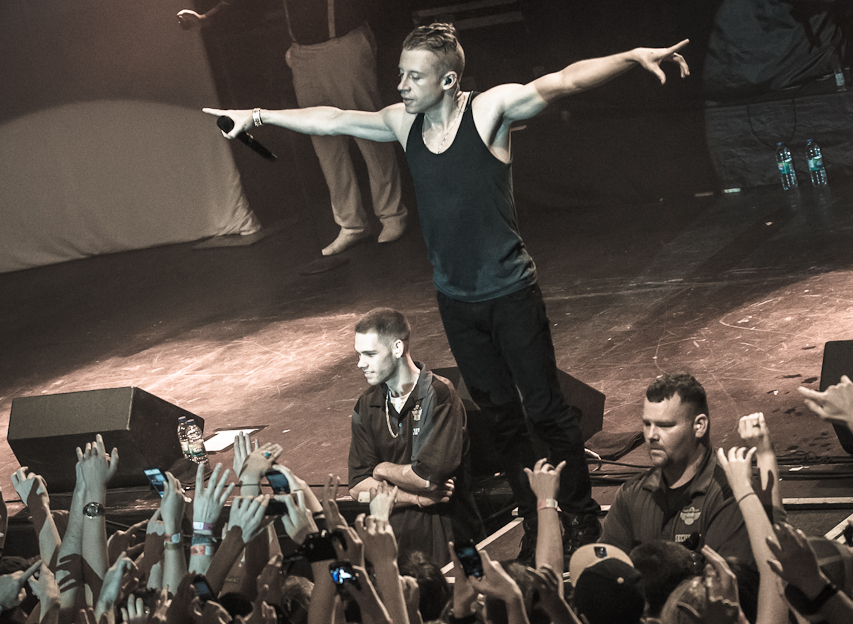
Macklemore performing at The Heist Tour in 2012

Their album The Heist was released in October 2012 and debuted on the U.S. Billboard 200 at number 2 of the week dated October 27, 2012, selling over 78,000 copies. "Same Love" was released on July 18, 2012, and later "White Walls". In January 2013, Music Choice featured Macklemore in the brand new series "Primed", which focuses on emerging artists. In May 2013, Haggerty was featured on Clinton Sparks's single "Gold Rush", along with 2 Chainz and D.A. The Heist World Tour began in August 2012 to promote The Heist.

In a private concert at the Experience Music Project museum in Seattle on May 16, 2014, Macklemore wore a costume featuring a wig, beard, and prosthetic hooked nose, which some said resembled a Jewish caricature, and accused him of antisemitism. Guests at the museum event had been asked to dress as their "favorite music icon or video character" — many who saw photos of him said that Macklemore's costume did not portray such an icon. The Stranger wrote that the nose Macklemore seemingly wore may have been a "Sheik/Fagin" nose. By May 20, the rapper had apologized and stated that his intention was to disguise himself, not to impersonate any 'type' of person. The Anti-Defamation League accepted Macklemore's apology, saying that they "take him at his word that he did not have any ill-intent" and believed that the issue was 'a tempest in a teapot' "over an unfortunate choice of wardrobe." B'nai B'rith International and Seth Rogen expressed doubt over the explanation provided by Macklemore.

In January 2015, Macklemore announced via Twitter that his third studio album would be released sometime in the second half of that year. Despite this, the album was not released until February 26, 2016. On August 5, 2015, Macklemore released a song for free download titled "Growing Up (Sloane's Song)", which features Ed Sheeran. On August 27, 2015, he released a new song called "Downtown" which features Foxy Shazam vocalist Eric Nally, Kool Moe Dee, Melle Mel, and Grandmaster Caz, which he performed at the 2015 MTV Video Music Awards on August 30. On his first tour in two years, An Evening with Macklemore and Ryan Lewis, Macklemore announced that his new album was finished and ready for release.

On January 15, 2016, Macklemore released a teaser video on his YouTube channel revealing the name of his third studio album, This Unruly Mess I've Made, and announcing that it was scheduled to be released on February 26, 2016. On January 22, 2016, the duo released "White Privilege II", the second single on This Unruly Mess I've Made. On February 26, 2016, Macklemore and Ryan Lewis released the album This Unruly Mess I've Made. Also in 2016, Macklemore released two solo singles, "Drug Dealer" and "Wednesday Morning". "Drug Dealer" features Macklemore rapping about his previous addictions and is featured in a documentary that includes clips of Macklemore discussing drug abuse with President Barack Obama. "Wednesday Morning" was released after the 2016 U.S. Election and features Macklemore rapping about the political future of the country. The tracks were produced by Budo. On June 15, 2017, Macklemore announced via his official Instagram that the duo were on hiatus.

=== 2017–present: Gemini & Ben ===
On June 15, 2017, Macklemore released "Glorious", featuring American singer Skylar Grey, as the lead single from Macklemore's second solo studio album Gemini. On July 26, 2017, Macklemore released "Marmalade", featuring American rapper Lil Yachty, as the second single from Macklemore's upcoming album. "Good Old Days", a collaboration with Kesha, was released as a single on October 9, 2017. Macklemore released Gemini on September 22. The album was produced by longtime collaborator Budo. On October 1, Macklemore performed "Same Love" in a set at the opening of the Grand Final of the National Rugby League in Sydney, Australia — something that was considered by some to be controversial in the middle of a national survey on same sex marriage. Macklemore stated that it was one of his best performances due to the circumstances and thanked the fans in Sydney for the reception that he received throughout. On December 11, 2017, Macklemore announced an upcoming co-headlining tour with Kesha titled The Adventures of Kesha and Macklemore. This was Macklemore's fifth headlining tour, promoting his album Gemini and Kesha's sixth headlining tour, promoting her third solo album Rainbow (2017). The tour began in Phoenix on June 6, 2018, and concluded in Tampa on August 5, 2018.

On October 29, 2021, Macklemore released a new single titled "Next Year", featuring American singer Windser. Macklemore also worked with Ryan Lewis on the single, marking their first collaboration in three years. On July 22, 2022, Macklemore released a new single, "Chant", with Australian musician Tones and I. On August 19, 2022, Macklemore released the single, "Maniac", featuring Windser and co-written and co-produced by Lewis. The third single, "Faithful", featuring NLE Choppa, was released on October 28, 2022. The fourth single, "Heroes", featuring DJ Premier, was released on January 20, 2023. Macklemore's third solo studio album, Ben, was released on March 3, 2023.

In May 2024, he released "Hind's Hall", a protest song in support of the 2024 pro-Palestinian protests on university campuses, with all proceeds donated towards UNRWA. In September 2026, Macklemore joined Ed Sheeran's Loop Tour as an opening act. On September 4, he performed "Hind's Hall" and delivered a two-minute speech calling for a free Palestine. His comments attracted backlash from pro-Israel groups and, on September 14, he was removed from the tour after concert venue owners organized a boycott against him. Following his removal from the tour, he announced the "Free Palestine Tour", with proceeds donated to organizations supporting Palestinians. The tour ran three shows in Dublin, Paris, and London in October 2026. Hozier, Kneecap, and Beoga performed alongside Macklemore at the Dublin show. Aurora, DJ Habibeats, Pomme, Portugal The Man, Redveil, Siba, Tamer Nafar, Xiuhtezcati Martinez, and Zeyne featured in the Paris show. Paloma Faith, Aja Monet, Vic Mensa, Nemahsis, Lucas Jones, and Cure for Paranoia joined the London show. He stated that he attempted to run a leg of the tour in the United States but was rejected by numerous venues.

== Personal life ==
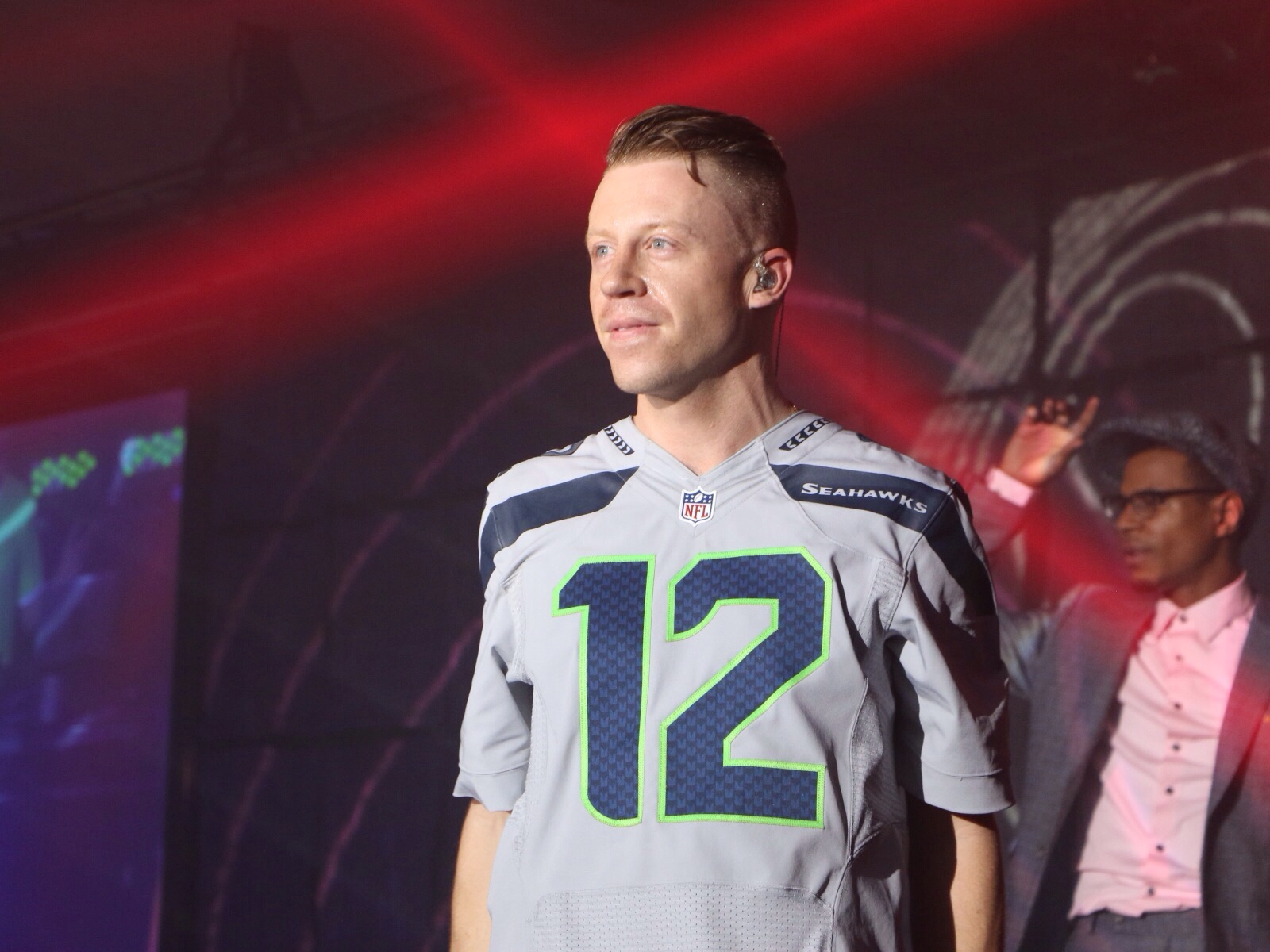
Macklemore at the official Seattle Seahawks post-game party in Jersey City after Super Bowl XLVIII (February 2014)

=== Family ===
Macklemore became engaged to his girlfriend of seven years, Tricia Davis, on January 21, 2013. On January 3, 2015, he announced on Twitter that he and Davis were expecting their first child that May. After the release of "Growing Up (Sloane's Song)", which featured English singer-songwriter Ed Sheeran, the couple announced that their daughter was born in May. They married on June 27, 2015.

In September 2017, the couple announced that they were expecting their second child. On April 3, 2018, Macklemore announced during a performance at the 3Arena that Davis had given birth to their second daughter. In 2021, they had their third child. Earlier in 2017, Macklemore and his grandmother, Helen Schott, celebrated her 100th birthday, with the two traveling around Modesto, California for the music video of his song "Glorious."

=== Health ===
In August 2008, Macklemore admitted himself into drug rehabilitation for drug addiction and alcoholism, and celebrated three years of sobriety before a brief relapse in 2011, which he describes in his song "Starting Over". He said in a 2012 documentary that he spent most of his twenties trying to combat his addictions and destructive way of life:

I want to be someone who is respected and not just in terms of my music. I want to be respected in terms of the way that I treat people... Music is my creative outlet in terms of expressing what is important to me; what has importance, what has a value. And I want to be respected for that.

On May 14, 2016, Macklemore appeared in U.S. President Barack Obama's weekly address to talk about the dangers of addiction to opioids and prescription painkillers. Macklemore talked about his own experiences with abuse of painkillers, stating "When you're going through it, it's hard to imagine anything being worse than addiction. But the shame and stigma associated with the disease keeps too many people from seeking the help they actually need. Addiction isn't a personal choice or a personal failure."

On September 29, 2018, Macklemore headlined a concert titled Recovery Fest in Pawtucket, Rhode Island, held as a drug- and alcohol-free event to support charities that worked in combating opioid addiction. In the summer of 2020, during and in part due to the social isolation that took place during the COVID-19 lockdowns, Macklemore relapsed and suffered an overdose. He was hospitalized and given treatment; he eventually recovered from the episode. This experience, as well as the ongoing challenge of overcoming addiction while also raising children, served as an inspiration for much of the lyrical content that makes up his third solo studio album, Ben.

== Activism and political views ==
Macklemore voiced his support of LGBT rights and same-sex marriage in the song "Same Love" released in 2012, which also condemns homophobia in mainstream hip-hop, society, and mass media. Macklemore is also an outspoken critic of Donald Trump. In July 2016, he was featured on "Pt. 2" remix of YG's "FDT (Fuck Donald Trump)" alongside G-Eazy. In January 2021, after the presidential inauguration of Joe Biden, he released "Trump's Over Freestyle". Macklemore attended the 2017 Women's March in Washington, D.C. On May 16, 2019, Macklemore received the Stevie Ray Vaughan Award from MusiCares, in recognition of his support of MusiCares and the addiction recovery process.

In August 2024, Macklemore cancelled his show scheduled to take place in October that year in Dubai, citing the United Arab Emirates' involvement "in the ongoing genocide and humanitarian crisis" in Sudan. He said he would not perform in the country until it "stops arming and funding the RSF". He also mentioned having no judgement of the artists continuing to perform in the Emirates.

=== Israeli–Palestinian conflict ===
Macklemore is a supporter of Palestinian liberation. On October 30, 2023, during the Gaza war, he signed the Artists4Ceasefire letter calling for a ceasefire and an end to the Israeli blockade of the Gaza Strip. In November 2023, while giving a speech at a pro-Palestinian rally in Washington, D.C., he criticised Israel for committing genocide against Palestinians. In December 2023, he read out a poem that called for a "Free Palestine" and criticized the United States' support for Israel in the Gaza war.

In May 2024, he released "Hind's Hall", a protest song in support of the 2024 Gaza war protests at universities, with all proceeds donated towards UNRWA.

At a pro-Palestinian rally in September 2024, Macklemore exclaimed "fuck America", causing widespread controversy, including being dropped from the Neon City Festival in Las Vegas. The Seattle Mariners, Seattle Kraken, and Seattle Sounders FC all condemned his statements and stated that they would review any further involvement from Macklemore. He later apologized for the incident, saying, "My thoughts and feelings are not always expressed perfectly or politely," and that at times he "slips up and gets caught in a moment."

Macklemore joined with Watermelon Pictures and BreakThrough News to produce The Encampments, a documentary film about the Gaza Solidarity Encampment at Columbia University. The film features interviews with prominent protestors, including Mahmoud Khalil. The Encampments premiered at CPH:DOX on March 25, 2025.

On October 30, 2026, Macklemore showed his support for Palestinian political leader Marwan Barghouti, who has been in Israeli prisons since 2002, by wearing a T-shirt with the words "Free Marwan" during his final performance of his European tour in London.

==== Ed Sheeran tour controversy ====
While opening for Ed Sheeran's Loop Tour in New Jersey at the MetLife Stadium in September 2026, Macklemore declared "Free Palestine," telling the audience "I believe that every human being walking on this earth deserves exactly the same freedom." He also condemned United States Immigration and Customs Enforcement (ICE) during his speech to the audience. The Israeli-American Council, a pro-Israel nonprofit organization, initiated a petition directed at Sheeran to remove Macklemore from the remainder of the tour. At the second MetLife Stadium concert, Macklemore restated his support of Palestinians, also saying that his proclamation and criticism of Israel is "in no way a criticism" of Jewish people, and "My message is for peace, love, for all human beings to be treated with dignity, respect, and equality." On September 14, 2026, Sheeran dropped Macklemore from the tour as a result of an ultimatum from several venue owners, including Robert Kraft. After he was dropped, Macklemore posted a statement on Instagram, saying: "Before I get into it, I want to say something that should be obvious. In this moment I think it matters. I am not a victim. Ed Sheeran is not a victim. Pink is not a victim. We have careers, money, opportunities, safety and audiences around the world. Whatever consequences any of us face for what we say, we get to go home to our families. The victims are the Palestinian people."

Aaron Rowe and Lukas Graham had been scheduled to replace Macklemore on Sheeran's remaining U.S. dates, while Beoga had been performing with Sheeran during his sets, and Finneas was scheduled to support Sheeran on dates in South America. All of them subsequently dropped out of the tour in solidarity with Macklemore and in support of and solidarity with Palestinians.

In September 2026, following the controversy, Macklemore announced he would embark on a "Free Palestine" tour with proceeds donated to organizations including Anera, Gaza Soup Kitchen, Medical Aid for Palestinians, Palestinian Youth Movement, Heal Palestine, Palestine Children's Relief Fund, Jewish Voices for Peace, and UNRWA.

=== Interests ===
Macklemore is a fan of the Seattle Seahawks. He created a 12th man promotional video and performed at the 2014 NFC Championship Game. He remains a fan of the now-relocated Seattle SuperSonics. In August 2019, Macklemore joined the ownership group of Seattle Sounders FC, the local Major League Soccer club. He is a fan of the Seattle Kraken of the National Hockey League; on April 18, 2022, the Kraken announced that Macklemore had joined its ownership group. Macklemore has an eclectic taste in art, including outlandish garments sporting sequins, fringe and feathers, a kitschy velvet painting of a bald eagle, an oil painting of Drake dancing and a Dan Lacey painting of a nude Justin Bieber.

== Discography ==
- The Language of My World (2005)
- Gemini (2017)
- Ben (2023)

== Filmography ==
Year	Title	Role	Notes
2013	Mac Miller and the Most Dope Family	Himself	Guest appearance (Season 1, Episode 2)
2014	Under the Gunn	Himself / Guest Judge	Episode: "Trouble in the Lounge"
2019	Songland	Himself / Guest Judge	Episode: "Macklemore"
2020	Scooby-Doo and Guess Who?	Himself	Episode: "The 7th Innings Scare!"
2020	Dave	Himself	Episode: "Dave's First"

== See also ==
- Macklemore & Ryan Lewis
- List of awards and nominations received by Macklemore & Ryan Lewis
- Ryan Lewis
