= Robin Thicke discography =

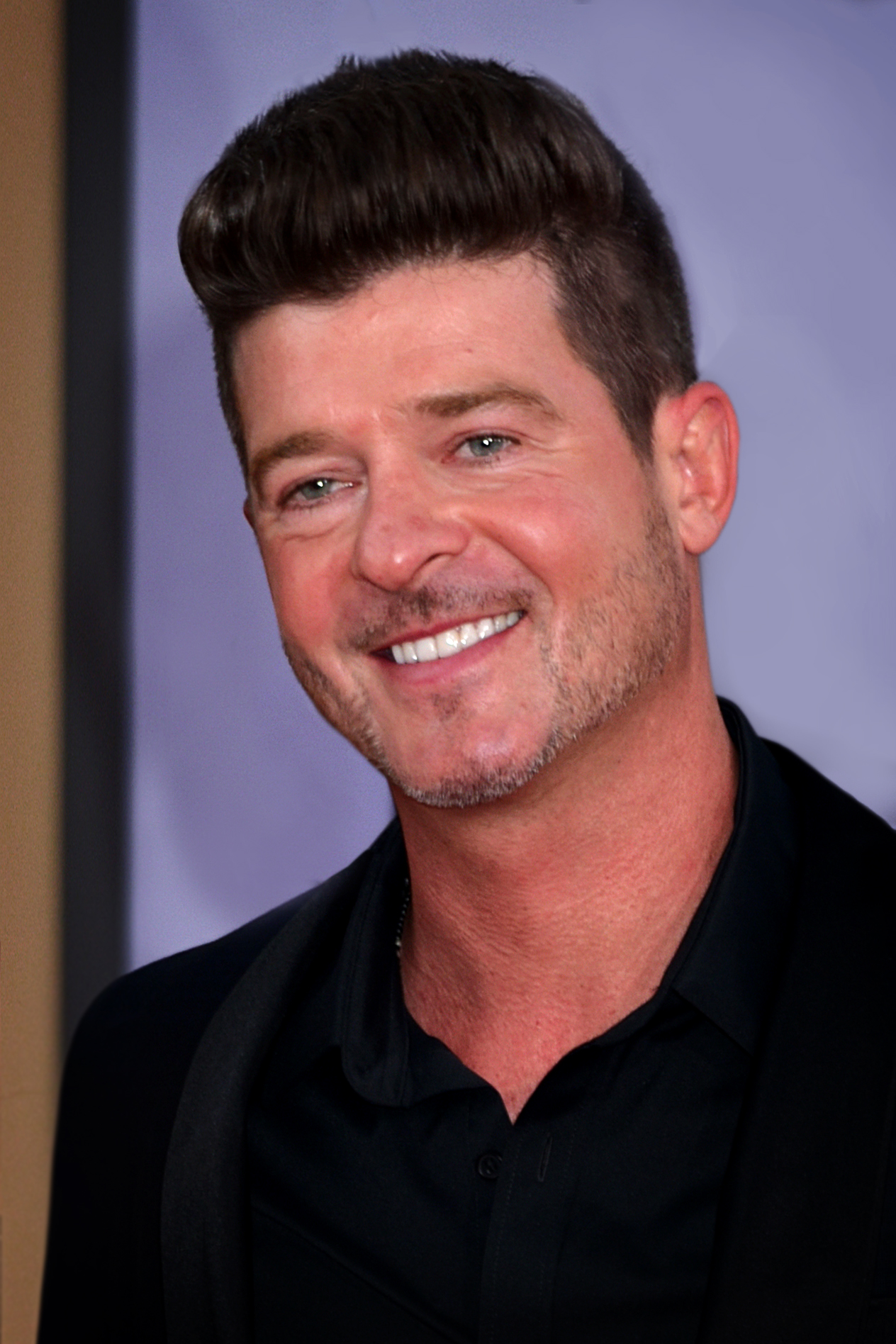
- Thicke in 2019
- Studio albums: 8
- Singles: 30
- Music videos: 23

The discography of American singer Robin Thicke consists of 8 studio albums, 30 singles and 23 music videos. Thicke signed his first recording contract with Interscope Records as a teenager and found success as a songwriter, before he began concentrating on his career as a performer. In 2000, Thicke started recording his debut album, A Beautiful World, which was released in October 2002. The album debuted at number 152 on the US Billboard 200, selling 119,000 copies. The record also peaked at number 36 on the Mega Album Top 100 in the Netherlands. Two singles were released from the album; the first, "When I Get You Alone" became a top ten hit in the Netherlands and New Zealand. That single also peaked at number 17 in Australia and was certified gold by the Australian Recording Industry Association (ARIA). In 2006, Thicke released his second studio album The Evolution of Robin Thicke. The record debuted at number 5 on the US Billboard 200, topped it on the Billboard's Top R&B/Hip-Hop Albums, and became a certified platinum by the Recording Industry Association of America (RIAA). The album also charted in France, the Netherlands, and the United Kingdom. The Evolution of Robin Thicke produced four singles, all of which charted on the Billboard's Hot R&B/Hip-Hop Songs. "Lost Without U" became one of his biggest hits, peaking at number 14 on the US Billboard Hot 100 and spending 11 weeks atop the Billboard's Hot R&B/Hip-Hop Songs.

Thicke's third studio album, Something Else was released in September 2008. The album peaked at number 3 on both the US Billboard 200, and on the Billboard's Top R&B/Hip-Hop Albums charts. The album's first two singles, "Magic" and "The Sweetest Love", both became top 20 hits on the Billboard's Hot R&B/Hip-Hop Songs. Sex Therapy: The Session was released in December 2009, peaking at numbers 9 and 2 on the US Billboard 200, and on the Billboard's Hot R&B/Hip-Hop Albums, respectively. Its title track, the first of four singles from the album, became Thicke's second number-one R&B hit. His fifth studio album, Love After War was released in December 2011, peaking at number 22 on the US Billboard 200, while producing two singles: "Love After War" and "Pretty Lil' Heart".

Thicke has attained his biggest commercial success to date with the releases of his sixth studio album Blurred Lines and its respective singles. The album's eponymous lead single was a worldwide hit, becoming Thicke's first Billboard Hot 100 number-one single, and also topping the charts in countries such as Australia, Canada, New Zealand and the United Kingdom. Aided by the single's success, the album debuted at number one on the Billboard 200 and produced the follow-up singles "Give It 2 U", "For the Rest of My Life" and "Feel Good".

== Albums ==
=== Studio albums ===
List of studio albums, with selected chart positions, sales figures and certifications
Title	Album details	Peak chart positions										Sales	Certifications
Title	Album details	US	US R&B	AUS	CAN	FRA	IRL	NLD	NZ	SWI	UK	Sales	Certifications
A Beautiful World	Released: October 15, 2002; Label: NuAmerica, Interscope; Formats: CD, digital download	152	—	—	—	—	—	36	—	—	—	US: 119,000	
The Evolution of Robin Thicke	Released: October 3, 2006 (US); Label: Star Trak, Interscope; Formats: CD, LP, digital download	5	1	—	58	184	—	60	—	—	30	US: 1,521,000	RIAA: Platinum; BPI: Silver
Something Else	Released: September 30, 2008 (US); Label: Star Trak, Interscope; Formats: CD, LP, digital download	3	3	—	26	92	—	25	—	65	83		RIAA: Gold
Sex Therapy: The Session	Released: December 15, 2009 (US); Label: Star Trak, Interscope; Formats: CD, digital download	9	2	—	—	—	—	—	—	—	—	US: 269,000	
Love After War	Released: December 6, 2011 (US); Label: Star Trak, Geffen; Formats: CD, digital download	22	6	—	—	—	—	—	—	—	—	US: 206,000	
Blurred Lines	Released: July 30, 2013 (US); Label: Star Trak, Interscope; Formats: CD, digital download	1	1	4	1	10	5	3	5	1	1	US: 731,000	RIAA: Gold; BPI: Gold; IFPI SWI: Gold; MC: Gold; SNEP: Gold
Paula	Released: July 1, 2014 (US); Label: Star Trak, Interscope; Formats: CD, digital download	9	2	207	—	—	—	88	—	63	200	US: 48,000	
On Earth, and in Heaven	Released: February 12, 2021 (US); Label: Lucky Music, Empire; Formats: CD, digital download, streaming	—	—	—	—	—	—	—	—	—	—		
"—" denotes a recording that did not chart or was not released in that territory.

== Singles ==
=== As lead artist ===
List of singles as lead artist, with selected chart positions and certifications, showing year released and album name
Title	Year	Peak chart positions										Certifications	Album
Title	Year	US	US Adult R&B	AUS	CAN	FRA	IRL	NLD	NZ	SWI	UK	Certifications	Album
"When I Get You Alone"	2002	—	—	17	—	—	—	5	8	62	—	ARIA: Gold	A Beautiful World
"Brand New Jones"	2003	—	—	—	—	—	—	—	—	—	—		A Beautiful World
"Wanna Love You Girl" (featuring Pharrell)	2005	—	—	—	—	—	—	—	—	—	—		The Evolution of Robin Thicke
"Lost Without U"	2006	14	1	—	—	54	46	—	37	—	11	RIAA: Platinum; BPI: Silver; RMNZ: Platinum	The Evolution of Robin Thicke
"Can U Believe"	2007	99	2	—	—	—	—	—	—	—			The Evolution of Robin Thicke
"Got 2 Be Down" (featuring Faith Evans)	2007	24	—	—	—	—	—	—	—	—			The Evolution of Robin Thicke
"Magic"	2008	59	2	—	60	—	—	33	—	64	95		Something Else
"The Sweetest Love"	2008	— (Note: "The Sweetest Love" did not enter the Billboard Hot 100, but peaked at number five on the Bubbling Under Hot 100 Singles chart.)	2	—	—	—	—	—	—	—	—		Something Else
"Dreamworld"	2009	—	32	—	—	—	—	—	—	—	—		Something Else
"Sex Therapy"	2009	54	10	—	—	—	—	—	—	—	—		Sex Therapy: The Session
"Rollacoasta" (featuring Estelle)	2010	—	—	—	—	—	—	—	—	—	—		Sex Therapy: The Session
"We Are the World 25 for Haiti" (as part of Artists for Haiti)	2010	2	—	18	7	—	9	—	8	—	50		Non-album single
"It's in the Mornin'" (featuring Snoop Dogg)	2010	— (Note: "It's in the Mornin'" did not enter the Billboard Hot 100, but peaked at number 17 on the Bubbling Under Hot 100 Singles chart.)	—	—	—	—	—	—	—	—	—		Sex Therapy: The Session
"Shakin' It 4 Daddy" (featuring Nicki Minaj)	2011	—	—	—	—	—	—	—	—	—	—		Sex Therapy: The Session
"Love After War"	2011	— (Note: "Love After War" did not enter the Billboard Hot 100, but peaked at number five on the Bubbling Under Hot 100 Singles chart.)	1	—	—	—	—	—	—	—	—		Love After War
"Pretty Lil' Heart" (featuring Lil Wayne)	2011	— (Note: "Pretty Lil' Heart" did not enter the Billboard Hot 100, but peaked at number six on the Bubbling Under Hot 100 Singles chart.)	—	—	—	—	—	—	—	—	—		Love After War
"All Tied Up"	2012	—	4	—	—	—	—	—	—	—	—		Love After War
"Exhale (Shoop Shoop)"	2012	—	—	—	—	—	—	—	—	—	—		Non-album single
"Blurred Lines" (featuring T.I. and Pharrell)	2013	1	1	1	1	1	1	1	1	1	1	RIAA: Diamond; ARIA: 9× Platinum; BPI: 4× Platinum; IFPI SWI: Platinum; MC: 9× Platinum; NVPI: Platinum; RMNZ: 6× Platinum; SNEP: Diamond	Blurred Lines
"For the Rest of My Life"	2013	—	1	—	—	82	—	—	—	—	—		Blurred Lines
"Give It 2 U" (featuring Kendrick Lamar and 2 Chainz)	2013	25	—	41	27	53	49	—	29	—	15	ARIA: Gold	Blurred Lines
"Feel Good"	2013	—	—	—	—	137	—	—	—	—	—		Blurred Lines
"Get Her Back"	2014	82	5	—	—	—	—	—	—	—	—		Paula
"Morning Sun"	2015	—	4	—	—	—	—	—	—	—	—		Non-album singles
"Back Together" (featuring Nicki Minaj)	2015	— (Note: "Back Together" did not enter the Billboard Hot 100, but peaked at number 25 on the Bubbling Under Hot 100 Singles chart.)	—	—	—	144	—	—	—	—	—		Non-album singles
"Deep" (with Nas)	2016	—	—	—	—	—	—	—	—	—	—		Non-album singles
"One Shot" (featuring Juicy J)	2016	—	—	—	—	—	—	—	—	—	—		Non-album singles
"Testify"	2018	—	—	—	—	—	—	—	—	—	—		Non-album singles
"That's What Love Can Do"	2019	—	1	—	—	—	—	—	—	—	—		On Earth, and in Heaven
"When You Love Somebody"	2019	—	15	—	—	—	—	—	—	—	—		Non-album single
"Forever Mine"	2020	—	—	—	—	—	—	—	—	—	—		On Earth, and in Heaven
"Fire It Up"	2020	—	—	—	—	—	—	—	—	—	—		Non-album single
"Beautiful"	2021	—	—	—	—	—	—	—	—	—	—		On Earth, and in Heaven
"Take Me Higher"	2021	—	—	—	—	—	—	—	—	—	—		On Earth, and in Heaven
"Look Easy"	2021	—	1	—	—	—	—	—	—	—	—		On Earth, and in Heaven
"Day One Friend" (featuring Rapsody)	2022	—	—	—	—	—	—	—	—	—	—		Non-album singles
"Brown Liquor" (featuring Yo Gotti)	2022	—	—	—	—	—	—	—	—	—	—		Non-album singles
"Bitter Sweet"	2023	—	—	—	—	—	—	—	—	—	—		Non-album singles
"Close to You" (with Annie Tracy)	2023	—	—	—	—	—	—	—	—	—	—		Non-album singles
"Hotel" (with Stevie Matthew)	2024	—	—	—	—	—	—	—	—	—	—		Non-album singles
"—" denotes a recording that did not chart or was not released in that territory.

=== As featured artist ===
List of singles as featured artist, with selected chart positions and certifications, showing year released and album name
Title	Year	Peak chart positions										Certifications	Album
Title	Year	US	US R&B	AUS	CAN	FRA	IRL	NLD	NZ	SWI	UK	Certifications	Album
"Shooter" (Lil Wayne featuring Robin Thicke)	2006	—	97	—	—	—	—	—	—	—	—		Tha Carter II
"Lay Back" (Rick Ross featuring Robin Thicke)	2009	—	— (Note: "Lay Back" did not enter the Hot R&B/Hip-Hop Songs chart, but peaked at number 11 on the Bubbling Under R&B/Hip-Hop Singles chart.)	—	—	—	—	—	—	—	—		Deeper Than Rap
"Somebody to Love" (Leighton Meester featuring Robin Thicke)	2009	— (Note: "Somebody to Love" did not enter the Billboard Hot 100, but peaked at number 11 on the Bubbling Under Hot 100 Singles chart.)	—	—	—	—	—	—	—	—	—		Non-album single
"Fall Again" (Kenny G featuring Robin Thicke)	2010	—	55	—	—	—	—	—	—	—	—		Heart and Soul
"Calling All Hearts" (DJ Cassidy featuring Robin Thicke and Jessie J)	2014	—	—	—	—	—	—	—	—	—	6		Paradise Royale
"I Don't Like It, I Love It" (Flo Rida featuring Robin Thicke and Verdine White)	2015	43	—	17	30	31	8	20	8	25	7	RIAA: Platinum; ARIA: Platinum; BPI: Platinum; RMNZ: Platinum	My House
"Bad Man" (Pitbull featuring Robin Thicke, Joe Perry and Travis Barker)	2016	—	—	—	—	—	—	—	—	—	—		Climate Change
"Looking Lovely" (Shaggy featuring Robin Thicke)	2026	—	—	—	—	—	—	—	—	—	—		Lottery
"—" denotes a recording that did not chart or was not released in that territory.

== Other charted songs ==
List of songs, with selected chart positions, showing year released and album name
Title	Year	Peak chart positions	Album
Title	Year	US R&B	Album
"Follow My Lead" (50 Cent featuring Robin Thicke)	2006	— (Note: "Follow My Lead" did not enter the Hot R&B/Hip-Hop Songs chart, but peaked at number 18 on the Bubbling Under R&B/Hip-Hop Singles chart.)	Curtis
"You're My Baby"	2008	91	Something Else
"Side Step"	2008	— (Note: "Side Step" did not enter the Hot R&B/Hip-Hop Songs chart, but peaked at number 21 on the Bubbling Under R&B/Hip-Hop Singles chart.)	Something Else
"Tie My Hands" (Lil Wayne featuring Robin Thicke)	2008	— (Note: "Tie My Hands" did not enter the Hot R&B/Hip-Hop Songs chart, but peaked at number three on the Bubbling Under R&B/Hip-Hop Singles chart.)	Tha Carter III and Something Else
"Things You Make Me Do" (Ashanti featuring Robin Thicke)	2008	— (Note: "Things You Make Me Do" did not enter the Hot R&B/Hip-Hop Songs chart, but peaked at number three on the Bubbling Under R&B/Hip-Hop Singles chart.)	The Declaration
"Million Dolla Baby" (featuring Jazmine Sullivan)	2009	— (Note: "Million Dolla Baby" did not enter the Hot R&B/Hip-Hop Songs chart, but peaked at number two on the Bubbling Under R&B/Hip-Hop Singles chart.)	Sex Therapy
"The New Generation"	2011	— (Note: "The New Generation" did not enter the Hot R&B/Hip-Hop Songs chart, but peaked at number 13 on the Bubbling Under R&B/Hip-Hop Singles chart.)	Love After War
"I Don't Know How It Feels to Be U"	2011	— (Note: "I Don't Know How It Feels to Be U" did not enter the Hot R&B/Hip-Hop Songs chart, but peaked at number 18 on the Bubbling Under R&B/Hip-Hop Singles chart.)	Love After War

== Other appearances ==
Title	Year	Other artist(s)	Album
"Turn the Page"	1999	Gloria Loring	Turn the Page
"The Prayer"	2003	Gloria Loring	You Make It Christmas
"Switch" (R&B Mix)	2005	Will Smith	Lost and Found
"Ask Myself"	2006	Mary J. Blige	Mary J. Blige & Friends
"Follow My Lead"	2007	50 Cent	Curtis
"Things You Make Me Do"	2008	Ashanti	The Declaration
"Tie My Hands"	2008	Lil Wayne	Tha Carter III
"Cocaine"	2009	50 Cent	War Angel LP
"Pregnant"	2009	R. Kelly, Tyrese, The-Dream	Untitled
"Bad Girls"	2009	Pitbull	Fast & Furious
"Phantom"	2010	Game	none
"Pushin' It"	2010	Game, T.I.	Brake Lights
"The Secret Garden"	2010	Quincy Jones, Usher, LL Cool J, Barry White, Tyrese, Tevin Campbell	Q Soul Bossa Nostra
"P.Y.T. (Pretty Young Thing)"	2010	Quincy Jones, T-Pain	Q Soul Bossa Nostra
"This Is Like"	2012	Tyga	Careless World: Rise of the Last King
"Love-Hate"	2012	Busta Rhymes	Year of the Dragon
"Next Move"	2012	Keyshia Cole	Woman to Woman
"All I've Ever Dreamed Of"	2013	Hit-Boy, Audio Push, K. Roosevelt	All I've Ever Dreamed Of
"Power of Love"	2013	Chanel West Coast	Now You Know
"Ride Like the Wind"	2013	Ron Burgundy	Anchorman 2: The Legend Continues: Music from the Motion Picture
"I Don't Like It, I Love It"	2015	Flo Rida, Verdine White	My House

== Music videos ==
=== As lead artist ===
List of music videos as lead artist, showing year and directors
Title	Year	Director(s)
"When I Get You Alone"	2003	Mat Kirkby
"Brand New Jones"	2003	Nzingha Stewart
"Wanna Love You Girl" (featuring Pharrell)	2005	Hype Williams
"Wanna Love You Girl" (Remix) (featuring Pharrell and Busta Rhymes)	2006	Paul Brown
"Lost Without U"	2006	Benny Boom
"Can U Believe"	2007	Benny Boom
"Magic"	2008	Robert Hales
"The Sweetest Love"	2008	Marc Baptiste
"Dreamworld"	2009	Anthony Mandler
"Sex Therapy"	2009	Melina
"Rollacoasta" (featuring Estelle)	2009	Gil Green
"It's in the Mornin'" (featuring Snoop Dogg)	2010	Gil Green
"Love After War"	2011	Hype Williams
"Pretty Lil' Heart" (featuring Lil' Wayne)	2012	Marc Klasfeld
"Exhale (Shoop Shoop)"	2012	Mick Partridge
"All Tied Up"	2012	Ryan Pallotta
"Blurred Lines" (featuring T.I. and Pharrell)	2013	Diane Martel
"Give It 2 U" (Remix) (featuring Kendrick Lamar and 2 Chainz)	2013	Diane Martel
"Feel Good"	2013	Sophie Muller
"Get Her Back"	2014	Jonas Åkerlund
"Still Madly Crazy"	2014	Robin Thicke
"Back Together" (featuring Nicki Minaj)	2015	Ben Mor
"Testify"	2018	Arrad Rahgoshay

=== As featured artist ===
List of music videos as featured artist, showing year and directors
Title	Year	Director(s)
"Shooter" (Lil Wayne featuring Robin Thicke)	2006	Benny Boom
"Follow My Lead" (50 Cent featuring Robin Thicke)	2006	Bernard Gourley
"Lay Back" (Rick Ross featuring Robin Thicke)	2009	Gil Green
"Somebody to Love" (Leighton Meester featuring Robin Thicke)	2009	Zoe Cassavetes
"Calling All Hearts" (DJ Cassidy featuring Jessie J and Robin Thicke)	2014	Director X
"I Don't Like It, I Love It" (Flo Rida featuring Robin Thicke and Verdine White)	2015	Director X

== See also ==
- Robin Thicke production discography
