= Benny Boom =

American film director

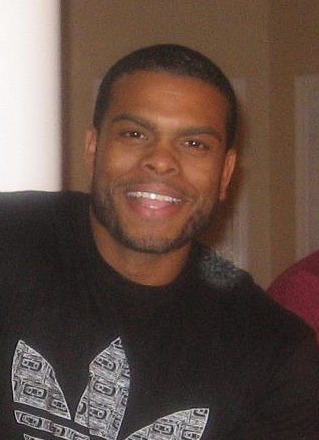
- Benny Boom in July 2012
- Born: Benny Douglas; July 22, 1971 (age 55); Philadelphia, Pennsylvania, U.S.
- Occupations: music video director; film director
- Years active: 2000–present
- Website: bennyboom.com

Benny Douglas (born July 22, 1971), professionally known as Benny Boom, is an American director who has worked in music, television, and film. His most commercially successful film was the 2017 Tupac Shakur biopic All Eyez on Me.

== Career ==
Douglas was born in Philadelphia, PA. and raised between Mount Airy and West Philadelphia He studied film at Temple University before moving to New York City, where he briefly collaborated with the hip hop duo Channel Live and adopted his nickname from that of boxer Ray "Boom Boom" Mancini. After working as a production assistant on the set of the 1995 Spike Lee film Clockers, Douglas was hired in an assistant role for music video directors Hype Williams, Director X, and Paul Hunter.

Starting in the 2000s, Douglas directed videos for artists such as Nas, Nelly, LL Cool J, Busta Rhymes, Nicki Minaj, Sean Combs, Keyshia Cole, Akon, Ciara and 50 Cent. For his efforts, he was awarded B.E.T.’s Video Director of the Year in 2009 and 2013 and 3 wins for BET Hip Hop awards Video Director of the year. The BET Award for Video Director of the Year is given to the best directors of music videos released in the same or previous year. Benny Boom has received the most nominations with sixteen each. Benny Boom also directed the nine-minute visual by Nicki Minaj and Lil Baby called "Do we Have a Problem" featuring actors Cory Hardrict and Joseph Sikora and sees Minaj play a double agent. The official music video was released on February 4, 2022 and received the award for Best Hip-Hop Video at the 2022 MTV Video Music Awards.

He also helmed commercial spots for Jeep, Honda, Gatorade, Sears and others. In 2009, Douglas made his feature film debut with the comedy, Next Day Air, starring Mike Epps, Omari Hardwick and Mos Def. His second film, the action drama S.W.A.T.: Firefight was released in 2011. His third film, All Eyez on Me, a biopic about rapper and actor Tupac Shakur, was released in June 2017.

Douglas made his television directorial debut in 2013, with an episode of 90210 (Season 5) for the CW Network, followed by the entire Season 2 of Knock Out, a reality boxing show, for FuseTV in 2015. He continued his television career in 2016 with episodes of dramas NCIS: Los Angeles and Empire, starring Taraji P. Henson and Terrence Howard. In 2019, Douglas became the director for the second season of The CW show, All American.

Douglas is represented by Paradigm Talent Agency for television and film. Douglas is a member of Alpha Phi Alpha

== Filmography ==
=== Films ===
- Next Day Air (2009)
- S.W.A.T.: Firefight (2011)
- 48 Hours to Live (2016)
- All Eyez on Me (2017)

=== Television ===
- Access Granted (2003–2008)
- 90210 (2013)
- NCIS: Los Angeles (2016–2020)
- Empire (2017)
- Tales (2017)
- Black Lightning (2018–2020)
- The Quad (2018)
- All American (2018–2022)
- Ambitions (2019)
- Council of Dads (2020)
- City on a Hill (2020)
- CSI: Vegas (2021–2022)
- Chicago P.D. (2021-2022)
- Queens (2021)
- The Equalizer (2021–2024)
- Our Kind of People (2021)
- Magnum P.I. (2022–23)
- All American: Homecoming (2022)

=== Music videos ===
50 Cent

- Just a Lil Bit (2005)
- Window Shopper (2005)
- Best Friend (Remix) (2006)
- Amusement Park (2007)
- Straight to the Bank (2007)

Akon

- Smack That (2006/ft. Eminem)
- I Wanna Love You (2006/ft. Snoop Dogg)

Amerie

- Why Don't We Fall In Love (2002)

Avant

- Read Your Mind (2003)
- Lie About Us (2006/ft. Nicole Scherzinger)

Benzino

- Shine Like My Son (2001)

Birdman

- What Happened to That Boy (2002/ft. Clipse)
- Stuntin' Like My Daddy (2006/ft. Lil Wayne)
- Pop Bottles (2007/ft. Lil Wayne)

BoA

- Jazzclub MV

B.o.B

- Out of My Mind (2012/ft. Nicki Minaj)

Bow Wow

- Fresh Azimiz (2005)
- Fresh Azimiz (Remix) (2005/ft. Mike Jones)

Burna Boy

- Big 7 (2023)

Busta Rhymes

- Touch It (2006)
- Touch It (Remix) (2006/ft. Mary J. Blige, Rah Digga, Missy Elliott, Lloyd Banks, Papoose and DMX)
- I Love My Chick (2006/ft. Kelis and will.i.am)
- New York Shit (2006/ft. Swizz Beatz) (co-directed by Justin Francis)

C-Side

- Boyfriend/Girlfriend (2008/ft. Keyshia Cole)

Cassidy

- I'm A Hustla (2005)

Channel Live

- Wild Out 2K (2000)

Cherish

- Do It to It (2006/ft. Sean Paul of YoungBloodZ)
- Amnesia (2008)

Ciara

- Goodies (2004/ft. Petey Pablo)
- 1, 2 Step (2004/ft. Missy Elliott)

Dappy

- No Regrets (2011)

David Guetta

- Light My Body Up (2017/ft. Nicki Minaj and Lil Wayne)

DJ Drama

- We in This Bitch (2012)

Fantasia

- I'm Doin' Me (2010)

G. Dep

- Everyday (2001)
- Special Delivery (rmx) (2002) f/ P. Diddy, Ghostface Killah, Craig Mack and Keith Murray

GloRilla

- Wanna Be (2024/with Megan Thee Stallion)
- Whatchu Kno About Me (2024/with Sexyy Red)
- I Luv Her (2024/with T-Pain)
- Procedure (2025/with Latto)

India Shawn

- Marmalade (2026)

Ja Rule

- Clap Back/ The Crown (2003)

Jacquees

- At the Club (2018)

Jazmine Sullivan

- 10 Seconds (2010)

Jibbs

- Chain Hang Low (2006)

JoJo

- Disaster (2011)

K. Michelle

- V.S.O.P. (2013)
- Can’t Raise a Man (2014)

Katerina Graham

- Put Your Graffiti on Me (2012)
- Wanna Say (2013)

Kelly Rowland

- Can't Nobody (2003)

Keyshia Cole

- (I Just Want It) to Be Over (2005)
- I Should Have Cheated (2005)
- Love (2006)
- Let It Go (/ft. Lil' Kim and Missy Elliott) (2007)
- I Remember (2007)
- Heaven Sent (2008)
- Playa Cardz Right (2008)
- You Complete Me (2009)
- Trust (2009)
- I Ain't Thru (/ft. Nicki Minaj) (2010)
- Long Way Down (2010)
- Enough of No Love (/ft. Lil Wayne) (2012)
- Trust and Believe (2012)
- You (/ft. Remy Ma and French Montana) (2017)

Kirko Bangz

- Keep it Trill (2012)

Lil' Kim

- The Jump Off (2003/ft. Mr. Cheeks)

Lil' Mo

- 4Ever (2003/ft. Fabolous)

Lil Wayne

- Shooter (2006/w. Robin Thicke)
- Hustler Musik / Money On My Mind (2007)

LL Cool J

- Luv U Better (2002)
- Paradise (2003/ft. Amerie)
- Baby (2008/ft. The-Dream)

Lyfe Jennings

- S.E.X. (2006/ft La La Brown)

Mario

- How Could You (2005)
- Boom (2005/ft. Juvenile)

Mase

- Breathe, Stretch, Shake (2004/ft. P. Diddy)

Meek Mill

- Ima Boss (2011/ft. Rick Ross)
- All Eyes on You (2015/ft. Nicki Minaj and Chris Brown)

Mobb Deep

- Got It Twisted (2004)
- Real Gangstaz (2004/ft. Lil Jon)

Monica

- U Should've Known Better (2004)

Mýa

- Lock U Down (2007/ft. Lil Wayne)

Nas

- Oochie Wally (2001/ft. Bravehearts)
- Got Ur Self A... (2001)
- Made You Look (2002)

Nelly

- Dilemma (2002/w. Kelly Rowland)
- Shake Ya Tailfeather (2003/ft. P Diddy and Murphy Lee)
- My Place (2004/ft. Jaheim)
- Errtime (2005)
- Stepped On My J's (2008/ft. Ciara and Jermaine Dupri)
- Body on Me (2008/ft. Akon and Ashanti)

New Kids on the Block

- Single (2008/ft. Ne-Yo)

Nicki Minaj

- Beez in the Trap (2012/ft. 2 Chainz)
- Right By My Side (2012/ft.Chris Brown)
- Pound the Alarm (2012)
- High School (2013/ft. Lil Wayne)
- No Frauds (2017/ft. Drake & Lil Wayne)
- Do We Have A Problem? (2021/ft Lil Baby)

P Diddy

- I Need a Girl Pt. 1 (2002/ft. Usher and Loon)
- I Need a Girl Pt. 2 (2002/ft. Ginuwine, Loon and Mario Winans)

Prince Royce

- Te Robaré (2013)

Rick Ross

- Push It (2006)

Sean Kingston

- Seasonal Love (2013/ft. Wale)

Sean Paul

- Like Glue (2003)

Sheek Louch

- Mighty D-Block (2 Guns Up) (2003/ft. Jadakiss)

P$C

- I'm A King (2005/ft. Lil' Scrappy)

Pussycat Dolls

- Beep (2006/ft. will.i.am)

R. Kelly

- I'm A Flirt (Remix) (2007/ft. T.I. and T-Pain)

Robin Thicke

- Shooter (2006/w. Lil Wayne)
- Lost Without U (2006)
- Can U Believe (2006)

Rooney

- When Did Your Heart Go Missing? (2007)

Shyne

- Jimmy Choo (2004/ft. Ashanti)

Snoop Dogg

- That's That (2006/ft. R. Kelly)

Swizz Beatz

- Bigger Business (2002/ft. P. Diddy, Ronald Isley, Baby, Jadakiss, Cassidy and Snoop Dogg)

T-Pain

- Buy U a Drank (Shawty Snappin')(2007/ft. Yung Joc)

Teairra Mari

- Hunt 4 U (2008/ft. Pleasure P)

Tink

- Million (2015)

Trey Songz

- Heart Attack (2012)
- 2 Reasons (featuring T.I.) (2012)

Tristan Wilds

- Love in the 90z (2016)

Waka Flocka Flame

- Hard in Da Paint (2010)
- Get Low (2012/ft. Nicki Minaj, Tyga and Flo Rida)

Wale

- Clappers (2013/ft. Juicy J and Nicki Minaj)

Youngbloodz

- Damn! (2003/ft. Lil Jon)

Young Jeezy

- Soul Survivor (2005/ft. Akon)

=== Live DVDs ===
- Pussycat Dolls: Live from London
  - With Chris Applebaum (2006)
