= Paula (album) =

Studio album by Robin Thicke
- Released: July 1, 2014
- Recorded: 2014
- Genre: R&B
- Length: 51:29
- Labels: Star Trak; Interscope
- Producers: Robin Thicke; Pro Jay

Robin Thicke chronology
| Blurred Lines (2013) | Paula (2014) | On Earth, and in Heaven (2021) |

Singles from Paula
- 1. "Get Her Back" Released: May 19, 2014

Paula is the seventh studio album by American singer Robin Thicke. The album's official release date was July 1, 2014, though it was streamed by Thicke's record company a day early, on June 30, 2014. The album, released by Star Trak Entertainment and Interscope Records, served as a tribute to his estranged wife Paula Patton. The album was supported by the single "Get Her Back".

Upon its release, Paula received mixed reviews from music critics. The album debuted at number 9 on the US Billboard 200 chart, selling 24,000 copies in its first week of release. The album sold only 530 copies in the United Kingdom, 550 in Canada, and 158 in Australia in its debut week.

== Background ==
In 2005, Robin Thicke married actress Paula Patton after dating for over a decade. On February 24, 2014, the couple announced their legal separation, saying in a statement, "We will always love each other and be best friends, however, we have mutually decided to separate at this time." In the months following the announcement, Thicke made several attempts to repair their marriage and began dedicating his 2006 song "Lost Without U" to Patton during his concerts. He then premiered the song titled "Get Her Back", written about her, at the 2014's Billboard Music Awards, and a month later, he announced that the title of his seventh album would be Paula, after the actress. Thicke said of making and titling this album,

I came right off a tour and I had all these songs and all these ideas and feelings in my heart. And I went right into the studio. I wrote all the songs in about three weeks and we recorded the album in about a month. Obviously all the songs were about her or about how I feel about her. A lot of songwriters have done this kind of thing before. They won't tell you in the title or they'll be suggestive ... I was just like, 'There's no reason to hide who this is about.' It's all about her.

== Composition ==
Paula is a concept album. The beginning of the song "Living in New York City" features Paula Patton saying, "I'm moving to New York". Thicke revealed that Paula contributed the brief recording of her voice as a favor and that the song was inspired by her making a similar statement to him previously.

== Critical reception ==
Professional ratings
Aggregate scores
| Source | Rating |
|---|---|
| Metacritic | 49/100 |
Review scores
| Source | Rating |
| AllMusic | 2/5 stars |
| Billboard | 3/5 stars |
| Entertainment Weekly | B− |
| Exclaim! | 4/10 |
| Los Angeles Times | 1.5/4 stars |
| New York Daily News | 3/5 stars |
| Now | 1/5 stars |
| Rolling Stone | 2.5/5 stars |
| Slant Magazine | 2.5/5 stars |
| USA Today | 3/4 stars |

Paula was met with mixed reviews from music critics. At Metacritic, which assigns a normalized rating out of 100 to reviews from critics, the album received an average score of 49, which indicates "mixed or average reviews", based on 11 reviews. Clover Hope of Billboard gave Paula a score of 64 out of 100, noting that Thicke and Patton's personal life makes the album interesting, while criticizing it for being too detailed. "Paula plays off how invasive and uncomfortable a celebrity breakup is — not just for the couple involved, but for those watching and, in this case, listening," Hope wrote. "Fans want to know, but maybe not this much." Alexa Camp of Slant Magazine gave the album two and a half out of five stars, criticizing "Get Her Back" for being reminiscent of an interlude and "Lock the Door" for "feel[ing] like an Unplugged version of a grander, more memorable song" (though praising its arrangement). She felt that "Black Tar Cloud" is a convincing apology, but criticized the song for its unflattering description of Patton. Elysa Gardner of USA Today gave the album three out of four stars, stating that the album "reminds us what a fluid and expressive singer Thicke can be". Gardner went on to note that "the album is more texturally and emotionally varied and melody-focused than last year's Blurred Lines, with arrangements that nod heavily to old-school soul". Mikael Wood of the Los Angeles Times gave the album one and a half stars out of four, saying "the record is a failure, a virtual what-not-to-do guide for both songwriters and spurned lovers. But in an age when appearance rules, there’s something kind of fascinating about Thicke's willingness to look this bad."

Julia LeConte of Now gave the album one out of five stars, saying "Solidifying the theory that Thicke rushed the record together in a weird play for both public sympathy and capital gain, each song reeks of some other influence, the only real originality coming via the confessional and often TMI lyrics." Kyle Anderson of Entertainment Weekly gave the album a B−, saying "Paula's muddled take on sexual politics probably won't woo his wife back, and the lack of an obvious "Blurred"-size hit means the Hot 100 may be equally unmoved." Andy Kellman of AllMusic gave the album two out of five stars, saying "Some of the songs that could fit on any non-conceptual Thicke release sound like commissioned work. Take 'Living in New York City,' a distant descendant of James Brown's 'Living in America' and Janet Jackson's 'Nasty,' seemingly made for a visitors bureau, or the equally hammy 'Tippy Toes,' which could be used to sell a line of footwear. Those aren't the only numbers that resemble frivolous 'Hey, we need one more' throwaways. Along with empty flash like 'Something Bad' and 'Time of Your Life,' they're all part of Thicke's least appealing album." Ryan B. Patrick of Exclaim! gave the album a four out of ten, saying "From the uninspiring album cover to the angst-y content within, Paula doesn't even reach the level of his pre-"Blurred Lines" output, which represents an equitably solid discography of R&B/soul."

== Commercial performance ==
The album debuted at number 9 on the Billboard 200 chart, with first-week sales of 24,000 copies in the United States. In its second week, the album dropped down 32 spots to number 41, selling 6,000 copies, bringing its total album sales to 30,000. In the United Kingdom, Paula debuted at number 200 on the UK Albums Chart, selling 530 copies in its first week. The album sold 158 copies in Australia that week. The album sold 550 copies in its first week in Canada.

== Track listing ==
All songs produced by Robin Thicke and Pro Jay.

Paula track listing
| No. | Title | Writer(s) | Length |
|---|---|---|---|
| 1. | "You're My Fantasy" | Thicke; James Gass | 5:57 |
| 2. | "Get Her Back" | Thicke; Bobby Keyes | 3:33 |
| 3. | "Still Madly Crazy" | Thicke | 2:55 |
| 4. | "Lock the Door" | Thicke | 4:21 |
| 5. | "Whatever I Want" | Thicke; Gass | 3:45 |
| 6. | "Living in New York City" | Thicke; William Taylor; Ronnie Breaux; Lemar Guillary | 3:26 |
| 7. | "Love Can Grow Back" | Thicke | 3:27 |
| 8. | "Black Tar Cloud" | Thicke; Keyes; Gass | 3:25 |
| 9. | "Too Little Too Late" | Thicke | 2:54 |
| 10. | "Tippy Toes" | Thicke | 3:07 |
| 11. | "Something Bad" | Thicke; Chris Payton; Larry Cox; Taylor; Breaux | 3:41 |
| 12. | "The Opposite of Me" | Thicke | 3:00 |
| 13. | "Time of Your Life" | Thicke | 2:57 |
| 14. | "Forever Love" | Thicke; Cox | 5:01 |
| Total length: | | | 51:29 |

Target deluxe edition bonus tracks
| No. | Title | Writer(s) | Length |
|---|---|---|---|
| 15. | "Too Little Too Late" (acoustic) | Thicke | 3:03 |
| 16. | "Get Her Back" (acoustic) | Thicke; Keyes | 3:05 |
| 17. | "The Opposite of Me" (acoustic) | Thicke | 3:01 |

iTunes Store re-release additional track
| No. | Title | Writer(s) | Length |
|---|---|---|---|
| 15. | "Forever Love" (Afrojack Remix) | Thicke; Cox | 4:31 |

== Personnel ==
Musicians

- Robin Thicke – lead vocals, background vocals (track 1), piano (3, 4, 6–9, 11, 12, 14), bass guitar (6, 9), drums (10), keyboards (11)
- Irina Chirkova – strings (track 9)
- Larry Cox – Wurlitzer (track 1), organ (tracks 7, 14), piano (track 10)
- Fifth Harmony – background vocals (tracks 10–12)
- Angie Fisher – background vocals (tracks 4, 11, 13)
- Javier Gonzalez – horns (track 7)
- Lemar Guillary – horns (tracks 6, 7, 9, 10, 13)
- Donald Hayes – horns (tracks 6, 7, 9, 13)
- Alexandra Isley – background vocals (tracks 4, 5, 9–11, 13)
- Cameron Johnson – horns (tracks 6, 7, 9, 10, 13)
- Kimberly Johnson-Breaux – background vocals (tracks 4, 5, 9–11, 13)
- Bobby Keyes – instruments (track 2), guitars (track 8)
- Chris Payton – guitar (tracks 5, 6, 9–13)
- Pro Jay – drums (tracks 1, 5, 7–9, 11), bass guitar (5, 8), piano (1, 13), guitars (1)
- Ann Marie Simpson – strings (track 9)
- Wesley Smith – horns (track 10)
- Matty Taylor – bass guitar (tracks 4, 7, 10–13)

Technical personnel

- Delbert Bowers – mixing assistant (tracks 1, 7–13)
- Chris Galland – mixing assistant (tracks 1, 7–13)
- Chris Gehringer – mastering
- Serban Ghenea – mixing (tracks 5, 6)
- Justin Hergett – mixing assistant (tracks 2–4)
- James Krausse – mixing assistant (tracks 2–4)
- Bill Malina – engineer
- Manny Marroquin – mixing (tracks 1, 7–13)
- Tony Maserati – mixing (tracks 2–4, 14)
- Adam Olmsted – additional engineering (tracks 7, 9)
- Tim Phillips – additional engineering (tracks 2, 8)
- Benjamin Rice – additional engineering (tracks 6, 13)

== Charts ==
=== Weekly charts ===
Weekly chart performance for Paula
| Chart (2014) | Peak position |
|---|---|
| Belgian Albums (Ultratop Wallonia) | 191 |
| Dutch Albums (Album Top 100) | 88 |
| Swiss Albums (Schweizer Hitparade) | 63 |
| UK Albums (OCC) | 200 |
| US Billboard 200 | 9 |
| US Top R&B/Hip-Hop Albums (Billboard) | 2 |

=== Year-end charts ===
Year-end chart performance for Paula
| Chart (2014) | Position |
|---|---|
| US Top R&B/Hip-Hop Albums (Billboard) | 73 |

== Release history ==
Release history and formats for Paula
| Region | Date | Format | Label |
|---|---|---|---|
| Various | June 30, 2014 | CD, digital download | Star Trak, Interscope |
| United States | July 1, 2014 | CD, digital download | Star Trak, Interscope |
