= Boyfriend/Girlfriend =

2008 single by C-Side

Single by C-Side featuring Flaire Jonez

from the album Class in Session
- Released: 2008
- Genre: Southern rap, Miami bass
- Length: 3:26
- Label: 1720, Universal Republic
- Producer: Marvelous J

C-Side singles chronology
"MySpace Freak" (2007)	"Boyfriend/Girlfriend" (2008)

"Boyfriend/Girlfriend" is the second single by hip-hop group C-Side from their EP Class in Session. The original version features Flaire Jonez while the remix features Keyshia Cole. It was released to radio and charted.

== Charts ==
Chart (2008)	Peak position
U.S. Hot R&B/Hip-Hop Songs	118

== Remix ==
"Boyfriend/Girlfriend" (Remix)

Single by C-Side featuring Keyshia Cole
- Released: March 25, 2008
- Recorded: 2007
- Genre: Southern rap, Miami bass
- Length: 3:37
- Label: 1720/Universal Republic
- Producers: Danja, Jazze Pha

C-Side singles chronology
"MySpace Freak" (2007)	"Boyfriend/Girlfriend" (Remix) (2008)	"Let's Make a Movie" (2009)

Keyshia Cole singles chronology
"Heaven Sent" (2008)	"Boyfriend/Girlfriend" (2008)	"I've Changed" (2008)

Cole's verses in the remix interpolate Usher's 2004 single "Burn". The music video for the song was directed by Benny Boom.

=== Music video ===
The music video was directed by Benny Boom.

=== Charts ===
Chart (2008)	Peak position
U.S. Billboard Hot 100	72
US Hot Rap Songs (Billboard)	19
US Pop Airplay (Billboard)	37
US Rhythmic Airplay (Billboard)	23
