= The Evolution of Robin Thicke =

Studio album by Robin Thicke
- Released: October 3, 2006
- Length: 60:13
- Labels: Star Trak; Interscope
- Producers: Robin Thicke; Pro J; The Neptunes

Robin Thicke chronology
A Beautiful World (2002)	The Evolution of Robin Thicke (2006)	Something Else (2008)

Singles from The Evolution of Robin Thicke
- 1. "Wanna Love U Girl" Released: August 9, 2005; 2. "Shooter" Released: April 9, 2006; 3. "Lost Without U" Released: December 4, 2006; 4. "Can U Believe" Released: April 12, 2007; 5. "Got 2 Be Down" Released: October 2, 2007

The Evolution of Robin Thicke is the second album by the American singer-songwriter Robin Thicke. It was released on October 3, 2006, by Star Trak Records and Interscope Records. The production on the album was primarily handled by Pro J and Thicke himself with additional production by the Neptunes. The album also features guest appearances from Faith Evans, Lil Wayne and Pharrell Williams. In February 2007, a deluxe edition of the album was released, which included all three new bonus tracks.

The Evolution of Robin Thicke was supported by two singles; "Wanna Love U Girl" and "Lost Without U". "Wanna Love You Girl" became an urban hit, while "Lost Without U" became a number-one hit on the US Hot R&B/Hip-Hop Songs. The album received generally mixed reviews from music critics but despite that became a sleeper hit. It debuted at number 45 on the US Billboard 200, selling 20,000 copies in its first week, but it later peaked at number five on the chart. In March 2007, the album was certified platinum by the Recording Industry Association of America (RIAA).

== Background ==
Before releasing his own music, Thicke established himself in the late 1990s as a songwriter and producer, contributing to albums by artists including Brandy, Jordan Knight, Christina Aguilera, and others, while recording and performing under the name Thicke. In the early 2000s, he returned to Interscope Records under Andre Harrell and Babyface's Nu America imprint and began developing his debut album, initially titled Cherry Blue Skies. Renamed A Beautiful World and released in 2003, the album was preceded by the internationally successful single "When I Get You Alone" but received limited promotion and reached only number 152 on the US Billboard 200, prompting Thicke to focus on songwriting and production collaborations while preparing his follow-up.

Following A Beautiful World, Thicke sought to begin work on his second album, but financial and creative disagreements with his record label resulted in a months-long stalemate. During this period, Pharrell Williams, who had established a distribution agreement with Interscope for his Star Trak label, expressed interest in Thicke to Interscope chairman Jimmy Iovine. Williams subsequently became involved in the project, and work began on what would become The Evolution of Robin Thicke. Thicke described the album to Billboard as reflecting a period of personal and professional isolation, explaining that he had lost his financial security, was facing the possible loss of his home, and had become increasingly isolated from his former social circle. He said that he spent much of this period alone at home writing songs on the piano, drawing on feelings of loneliness and uncertainty for several songs.

== Promotion ==
Thicke toured with India.Arie and then opened for John Legend towards the end of 2006. Notable performances in support of the album and its single, "Lost Without U", including at the 2007's BET Awards, the 2007's MOBO Awards, American Idol, and the 2007's Soul Train Music Awards. The song, "Angels", appeared on General Hospital, which aired on November 22, 2006, during Luke and Laura's goodbye scene. The song, "Shooter" was played during Jason and Sonny's shootout scene from April 12 to April 13, 2007. The song, "Lost Without U", was played on October 2, 2007, during a love scene between Sonny and Kate.

== Singles ==
The album's lead single, titled "Wanna Love U Girl" featuring Pharrell, was released on August 9, 2005, before the album was officially released. The single experienced chart success on urban radio in the United Kingdom. The remix to "Wanna Love You Girl" was released, adding to it was an American rapper Busta Rhymes. The album's second single, "Lost Without U" was released on January 30, 2007. The single began getting a lot of radio airplay in Urban & Rhythmic radio stations from 2006 to 2007. The song reached number 14 on the US Billboard Hot 100 and number 1 on the Billboard's Hot R&B/Hip-Hop Songs. As a result, Thicke became the first Caucasian male artist since George Michael to top the R&B singles chart.

Thicke and his record label Interscope soon considered a potential track to be released as the album's third single. Thicke's preference was the track "Can U Believe" (released on April 12, 2007), which has peaked at number 15 on the US Billboard Hot R&B/Hip-Hop Songs and at number 99 on the Billboard Hot 100. On October 2, 2007, "Got 2 Be Down" was officially released to radio airplay as the album's fourth single.

== Critical reception ==
Professional ratings
Review scores
Source	Rating
AllMusic	3.5/5 stars
The Guardian	2/5 stars
The Observer	4/5 stars
Okayplayer	4/5 stars
Prefix	7.5/10
PopMatters	6/10
Slant Magazine	3/5 stars
USA Today	3/4 stars
Vibe	4/5 stars
Yahoo! Music UK	3.5/5 stars

The Evolution of Robin Thicke received generally favorable reviews, with critics praising Thicke's falsetto, relaxed vocal delivery, blue-eyed soul influences, and polished production, while noting the album's uneven pacing and occasional stylistic excesses. Ben Thompson of The Observer praised Thicke's smooth falsetto, songwriting, and understated performances, comparing the album favorably with Justin Timberlake's FutureSex/LoveSounds and highlighting "Lost Without U." USA Today's Elysa Gardner praised Thicke's fluid tenor and understated sensuality, likening his vocal style to Marvin Gaye while noting that some of the album's 16 tracks meandered; she singled out "Got 2 Be Down," "Lonely World," and "Cocaine" as highlights. Writing for Okayplayer. Enyi Emesih praised The Evolution of Robin Thicke as a strong artistic progression from Thicke's debut, highlighting its improved songwriting, polished production, jazzy and Latin influences, and more mature R&B sound.

David Jeffries of AllMusic viewed the album as ambitious but inconsistent, criticizing its soft opening and uneven flow while praising Thicke's blue-eyed neo-soul style and tracks such as "Wanna Love U Girl," "Can U Believe," and "Complicated." Preston Jones from Slant Magazine praised the varied and polished production, Thicke's falsetto, and harmonies reminiscent of Prince and Marvin Gaye, while highlighting "Lost Without U" and "Ask Myself." Prefix similarly praised the album's classic-soul influences, mature songwriting, and Thicke's strength on ballads and mid-tempo tracks, particularly "Got 2 Be Down" and "Lost Without U." Steven J. Horowitz of PopMatters gave the album 6/10, praising its softer blue-eyed soul direction and balance of ballads and uptempo material, but criticizing its stylistic detours and lack of originality. Alex Macpherson of The Guardian praised Thicke's smoother R&B material, while criticizing the slower songs, awkward metaphors, and stylistic missteps

== Commercial performance ==
The Evolution of Robin Thicke debuted at number 45 on the US Billboard 200, selling 20,000 copies in its first week. After climbing the charts for five months, the album reached at a peak position at number five on the US Billboard 200 and sold 57,000 copies that week. The album also reached a peak position at number one on the US Top R&B/Hip-Hop Albums chart. This became the first R&B number one album of Thicke's career. From February 24 to March 3, 2007, both his second single "Lost Without U" and his second album The Evolution of Robin Thicke simultaneously spent two consecutive weeks at number 1 on both the R&B single and album charts, respectively. On the March 3, 2007 issue of Billboard magazine, Thicke simultaneously topped 4 Billboard charts; including Top R&B/Hip-Hop Albums, Hot R&B/Hip-Hop Songs, Hot R&B/Hip-Hop Airplay and Hot Adult R&B Airplay. Due to the popularity of "Lost Without U", the sales of the album started to increase. On March 23, 2007, the album was certified platinum by the Recording Industry Association of America (RIAA) for sales of over a million copies in the United States.

== Track listing ==
"Wanna Love U Girl" produced by The Neptunes; all other tracks produced by Robin Thicke and Pro J.

The Evolution of Robin Thicke track listing
No.	Title	Writer(s)	Length
1.	"Got 2 Be Down" (featuring Faith Evans)	Robin Thicke; James Gass; Faith Evans	4:33
2.	"Complicated"	Thicke	4:13
3.	"Would That Make U Love Me"	Thicke	3:36
4.	"Lost Without U"	Thicke; Sean Hurley	4:14
5.	"Ask Myself"	Thicke; Bobby Keyes; Robert Daniels	3:47
6.	"All Night Long" (featuring Lil Wayne)	Thicke; Gass; Dwayne Carter, Jr.; Daniels	3:41
7.	"Everything I Can't Have"	Thicke; Gass; Moises Vivanco	3:23
8.	"Teach U a Lesson"	Thicke; Gass	4:28
9.	"I Need Love"	Thicke	4:55
10.	"Wanna Love U Girl" (featuring Pharrell)	Thicke; Pharrell Williams	4:23
11.	"Can U Believe"	Thicke; Daniels	4:51
12.	"Shooter" (featuring Lil Wayne)	Thicke; Carter, Jr.; Keyes; Gass; Daniels	4:37
13.	"Cocaine"	Thicke; Gass	3:30
14.	"2 the Sky"	Thicke; Larry Cox II; Greg Malone; Ronnie Breaux, Jr.; Justin Derrico	6:05
15.	"Lonely World"	Thicke	4:21
16.	"Angels"	Thicke	8:35

Deluxe edition (bonus tracks)
No.	Title	Writer(s)	Length
17.	"Superman"	Thicke; Daniels	4:19
18.	"U Center Me"	Thicke	4:15
19.	"Look at Me"	Thicke	4:33

== Personnel ==
Credits adapted from album's liner notes.

- Ronnie "L.B." Breaux Jr. — drums (tracks 14, 16)
- Andrew Coleman — engineer (track 10)
- Larry Cox II — Rhodes piano (tracks 9, 14), organ (tracks 11, 16), bass (track 9)
- Justin Derrico — guitar (tracks 9, 16)
- Faith Evans — vocals (track 1)
- Brian Gardner — mastering
- Gary Grant — horn arrangements (track 15)
- Chad Hugo — producer and instrumentation (track 10)
- Sean Hurley — bass (tracks 4, 11, 12, 14, 16), acoustic guitar (track 4)
- Bobby Keyes — guitar (tracks 5, 11, 12, 14), guitar solo (track 4)
- Harry King — piano (track 12)
- Lil Wayne — rap (tracks 6, 12)
- Bill Malina — engineer (tracks 9, 11, 14–16)
- Bill Meyers — horn and string arrangements (track 12)
- Pro J — producer (tracks 1–9, 11–16), mixing (track 3), engineer (tracks 1–9, 12, 13, 15), bass (tracks 12, 15), drums (tracks 11, 15), guitar (track 11), keyboards (track 15), instrumentation (tracks 1–6, 8, 12, 13)
- Robin Thicke — vocals (all tracks), producer (tracks 1–9, 11–16), piano (tracks 2, 4, 11, 14–16), drums (track 2), guitar (track 3), keyboards (track 15)
- Rich Travali — mixing (tracks 1, 2, 4–16)
- Pharrell Williams — producer, vocals, and instrumentation (track 10)

== Charts ==
=== Weekly charts ===
Weekly chart performance
Chart (2006–2007)	Peak position
Dutch Albums (Album Top 100)	60
French Albums (SNEP)	184
Italian Albums (FIMI)	92
UK Albums (Official Charts)	30
US Billboard 200	5
US Top R&B/Hip-Hop Albums (Billboard)	1

=== Year-end charts ===
Year-end chart performance
Chart (2007)	Position
US Billboard 200	22
US Top R&B/Hip-Hop Albums (Billboard)	3

== Certifications ==
Certifications of The Evolution of Robin Thicke
Region	Certification	Certified units/sales
United Kingdom (BPI)	Silver	60,000^{‡}
United States (RIAA)	Platinum	1,521,000
^{^} Shipments figures based on certification alone.^{‡} Sales+streaming figures based on certification alone.
