= Love After War =

Studio album by Robin Thicke
- Released: December 6, 2011
- Recorded: 2010–11
- Genres: R&B; blue-eyed soul
- Length: 61:40
- Labels: Star Trak; Geffen
- Producers: Neil Jacobson; Pro-J; Kam Sangha; Robin Thicke

Robin Thicke chronology
Sex Therapy: The Session (2009)	Love After War (2011)	Blurred Lines (2013)

Singles from Love After War
- 1. "Love After War" Released: October 11, 2011; 2. "Pretty Lil' Heart" Released: November 8, 2011; 3. "All Tied Up" Released: April 10, 2012

Love After War is the fifth studio album by American R&B recording artist Robin Thicke. It was released on December 6, 2011, by Star Trak Entertainment in the United States. Drawing on Thicke's experiences of becoming a father and his relationship with Paula Patton, the album explores the "inner wars" of relationships and personal struggles, emphasizing love, compassion, patience, and understanding. Thicke wrote and produced the album himself, with Lil Wayne as its sole guest collaborator.

The album received generally mixed-to-positive reviews, with critics praising Thicke's vocals, romantic songwriting, and polished blend of soul, funk, and bossa nova influences, while some found the 17-track album repetitive or overly superficial. Commercially, the underperformed. It debuted at number 22 on the US Billboard 200 and number 6 on the Top R&B/Hip-Hop Albums, becoming his fourth consecutive top-ten album on the latter chart but his first since A Beautiful World (2002) to miss the Billboard 200 top ten. The album's title track became Thicke's second number one hit on the US Adult R&B Songs chart.

== Background ==
For his fifth studio album, Love After War, Thicke drew heavily on the experience of becoming a father and the changes it brought to his relationship with his wife, Paula Patton. Many of the album's songs were inspired by Patton and their relationship, while Thicke described the project more broadly as an exploration of the "inner wars" people face in relationships and within themselves. He wrote and produced the album himself, with Lil Wayne as its only guest collaborator, and sought to move beyond conflict, fear, and emotional turmoil toward love, compassion, patience, and understanding Thicke also connected the album’s emotional vulnerability to his identity as a soul singer, emphasizing the importance of personal relationships and vulnerability in his music.

== Singles ==
The album's lead single and title track, "Love After War", was released on October 11, 2011, and officially impacted U.S. Urban radio on October 18, 2011. The music video was released on November 21, 2011. The single also impacted Smooth Jazz radio on November 22, 2011. The album's second single, "Pretty Lil' Heart", featuring Lil Wayne, was released on November 8, 2011, and impacted Urban and Urban Mainstream radio on November 21 and November 22, respectively. The music video, in which Thicke adopted a James Dean-inspired look, was released on March 2, 2012. "All Tied Up" was subsequently released as the album's third single and impacted Urban Adult Contemporary radio on April 10, 2012. Its music video was released on June 7, 2012.

== Critical reception ==
Professional ratings
Review scores
Source	Rating
About.com	4/5 stars
AllMusic	3/5 stars
Entertainment Weekly	B+
Rolling Stone	3/5 stars
Slant Magazine	3/5 stars
USA Today	3/4 stars

Love After War received generally mixed to positive reviews from music critics. Mark Edward Nero of About.com called it a "tender and romantic" album and described Thicke as one of contemporary R&B's most "sensitive yet sexual" singers, praising his growth as a vocalist and songwriter and its more personal approach. Kyle Anderson of Entertainment Weekly similarly praised Thicke's "creamy voice", although he felt that the 17-track album became somewhat exhausting in its latter stages. Elysa Gardner of USA Today praised Thicke's "dextrous singing", noting echoes of Marvin Gaye and Michael McDonald and his ability to give old-school R&B textures a fresh, understated finish. Writing for Fact, Alex Macpherson praised the album's predominantly smooth, bossa nova-influenced soul and its "understated but irresistible melodic touches", while highlighting Thicke's ability to balance his suave loverman image with an awkward, humorous side that made him more endearing. He described the album as an effective blend of polished romanticism and Thicke's playful personality.

Allison Stewart of The Washington Post viewed Love After War as a more assured follow-up to Sex Therapy, praising its blend of falsetto-led ballads and funk-oriented tracks. She characterized the album as drawing on the "Marvin Gaye School of Socially Conscious Babymaking", highlighting the Prince-influenced "I'm an Animal" and "An Angel on Each Arm" while finding the socially conscious "The New Generation" weighed down by its earnestness. Less impressed, AllMusic editor Andy Kellman described Thicke's sound as "suave, and even more swashbuckling", but felt that the album's second half offered little development from his earlier work. Slant Magazine's Matthew Cole was more critical, arguing that Thicke's full-voice performances produced "mixed results" and that the album's 17-track "seduction routine" caused its weaker material to accumulate. Nate Chinen of The New York Times likewise found the album too superficial, writing that Thicke "ask[s] you to admire his tasteful slickness without delving much deeper than the surface." Rolling Stone writer Jody Rosen was more favorable toward Thicke's romantic material, highlighting his acoustic guitar work and "feathery upper register" as particularly effective expressions of his strengths as a singer.

== Commercial performance ==
The album debuted at number 22 on the Billboard 200 and number six on the Top R&B/Hip-Hop Albums, with first-week sales of 41,000 copies in the United States. Although it became his fourth consecutive album to reach the top ten on the latter chart, it was his first to miss the top ten on the Billboard 200 since his debut album, A Beautiful World (2002), and ultimately sold approximately 206,000 copies in the United States, according to Nielsen SoundScan. Reflecting on the album's commercial performance, Thicke later expressed disappointment, questioning whether continuing to invest so heavily in his music was worthwhile after the comparatively weak sales.

== Track listing ==
All tracks are written by Robin Thicke, except where noted.

No.	Title	Writer(s)	Length
1.	"An Angel on Each Arm"		4:12
2.	"I'm an Animal"		4:05
3.	"Never Give Up"	Thicke, M. Garcia	2:37
4.	"The New Generation"		3:59
5.	"Love After War"		3:16
6.	"All Tied Up"		3:53
7.	"Pretty Lil' Heart" (featuring Lil Wayne)		3:35
8.	"Mission"		2:46
9.	"Tears on My Tuxedo"		5:14
10.	"Boring"		3:28
11.	"Lovely Lady"		2:05
12.	"Dangerous"		3:42
13.	"Full Time Believer"	Thicke, Bobby Keyes	4:03
14.	"I Don't Know How It Feels to Be U"		5:30
15.	"Cloud 9"	Thicke, Bobby Keyes	2:57
16.	"The Lil' Things"		2:47
17.	"What Would I Be?"		3:23

Deluxe edition (bonus tracks)
No.	Title	Length
18.	"Stupid Things"	4:54
19.	"Compass or Map"	3:55
20.	"We a Family"	3:35

Sample credits

- "Never Give Up" contained a sample of José Pablo Moncayo's 1941 piece Huapango.

== Personnel ==
Credits for Love After War adapted from AllMusic.

- Sarah Alminawi – marketing coordinator
- Beau Benton – publicity
- Al Branch – management
- Moses Burdon – design
- John Codling – cover painting
- Larry Cox – bass, Fender Rhodes, organ, piano, strings
- DJ Mormile – A&R
- Tiffany Ferguson – A&R
- Michael "Mike Banga" Gahadia – engineer
- M. Garcia – composer
- Karen Goodman – marketing
- Nick J. Groff – A&R
- Bernie Grundman – mastering
- Lamar Guillory – horn
- Andre Harrell – executive producer
- Justin Hergett – mixing assistant
- Stephanie Hsu – creation
- Neil Jacobson – executive producer, management
- Bobby Keyes – bass, composer, guitar, soloist
- Joe "Dr. Soose" Liemberg – horn
- Anthony Mandler – photography
- Garnett March – promoter
- Tony Maserati – mixing
- Justine Massa – creation
- Jarius Mozee – bass, guitar
- Jason Nower – photography
- Jennifer Paola – A&R
- Pro-Jay – bass, bells, drums, engineer, flute, guitar, horn, instrumentation, organ, producer, strings
- Furqan Raschke – A&R
- Brenda Reynoso – publicity
- Gee Roberson – management
- Jamie Roberts – legal counsel
- Kate Rosen – publicity
- Kam Sangha – producer
- Amanda Silverman – publicity
- Chris Tabron – mixing assistant
- Matty Taylor – bass
- Anna Tes – design
- Robin Thicke – art direction, bass, composer, drums, executive producer, Fender Rhodes, piano, producer, vocals
- Jeanne Venton – A&R
- Tracey Waples – management

== Charts ==
=== Weekly charts ===
Weekly performance for Love After War
Chart (2011–12)	Peak position
US Billboard 200	22
US Top R&B/Hip-Hop Albums (Billboard)	6

=== Year-end charts ===
Year-end performance for Love After War
Chart (2012)	Position
US Billboard 200	199
US Top R&B/Hip-Hop Albums (Billboard)	34
