= Pretty Lil' Heart =

2011 single by Robin Thicke featuring Lil Wayne

Single by Robin Thicke featuring Lil Wayne

from the album Love After War
- Released: November 8, 2011
- Genre: Soul
- Length: 3:35
- Label: Star Trak; Interscope
- Songwriter: Robin Thicke

"Pretty Lil' Heart" is a song by the American singer Robin Thicke featuring the rapper Lil Wayne. It was released on November 8, 2011, as the second single from Thicke's fifth studio album, Love After War. Wayne raps the opening verse over a mid-tempo piano beat, and Thicke takes over for the rest of the song.

Critics responded well to the single, and several described it as smooth and romantic. A music video, in which Thicke adopts a James Dean-inspired look, was released in March 2012.

== Background and release ==
Thicke and Wayne had worked together before. Wayne appeared on "Shooter", from Thicke's 2006 album The Evolution of Robin Thicke, and Thicke sang on "Tie My Hands", from Wayne's 2008 album Tha Carter III. Thicke had debuted the title track of Love After War in September 2011. Speaking to Rap-Up about the album, he said it was written and produced by himself, as his first few albums had been.

"Pretty Lil' Heart" was posted online on November 2, 2011, and went on sale through iTunes on November 8. Love After War followed on December 6, 2011, on Star Trak and Interscope.

== Composition and lyrics ==
Wayne opens the song with a spacey, romantic rap over a mid-tempo piano beat. Thicke comes in afterward, and in the chorus he reassures his partner. Tom Breihan of Stereogum described the track as a classic old-school soul glide, with a rippling guitar line and well-placed horn stabs. He added that Wayne's verse is brief and that the song is mostly Thicke's. Niki McGloster of Vibe called it a smooth, guitar-driven record.

Writers heard the lyrics in different ways. PopCrush called the song a tender ballad on which both artists show a softer side. It described Wayne as soft-spoken and sincere in his verse, and heard Thicke's verses as asking his partner to confirm that her devotion is real. In a column about relationships, McGloster read the song as being about a man who feeds his partner's insecurity by reassuring her constantly, and suggested that this is not always healthy.

== Music video ==
The music video was released on March 2, 2012. Rap-Up noted that Thicke takes on a James Dean-inspired look. Complex wrote that he confesses his love for a partner and seduces her outside a hotel while sharing his feelings.

Thicke also performed the song on The Ellen DeGeneres Show. In the same appearance he sang "Exhale (Shoop Shoop)" as a tribute to Whitney Houston, who had recently died.

== Critical reception ==
Fitzgerald of PopCrush called it a great song and welcomed Thicke's return to soulful territory, though he was unsure whether radio would take to it. Breihan felt it was not quite as perfect as "Shooter" but was still very smooth. Rose Lilah of HotNewHipHop called it a solid addition to Thicke's body of work. Eliot Glazer of Vulture wrote that the two artists had mastered the slow jam. When it posted the video, Complex described the song as a standout from the album.

In 2013, XXL included the song in a list of Thicke's ten best hip-hop collaborations. Dan Buyanovsky described it as groovy, confident and vulnerable, and said Wayne sounded comfortable on it. He also noted that at one point the two had appeared on nearly every one of each other's projects.

== Awards and nominations ==
Organization	Year	Award	Result	Ref.
Juno Awards	2012	R&B/Soul Recording of the Year	Nominated	
