= On Earth, and in Heaven =

Studio album by Robin Thicke
- Released: February 12, 2021
- Genre: R&B
- Length: 35:22
- Labels: Lucky Music; Empire
- Producers: James Gass; Chaz Jackson; Dre Pinckney; Dashawn “Happie” White; Robin Thicke; Pharrell Williams

Robin Thicke chronology
Paula (2014)	On Earth, and in Heaven (2021)

Singles from On Earth, and in Heaven
- 1. "That's What Love Can Do" Released: March 8, 2019; 2. "Beautiful" Released: January 15, 2021; 3. "Take Me Higher" Released: January 22, 2021; 4. "Look Easy" Released: February 12, 2021

Professional ratings
Review scores
Source	Rating
AllMusic	4/5 stars

On Earth, and in Heaven is the eighth studio album by American singer Robin Thicke. The album was released on February 12, 2021, on Lucky Music and Empire.

== Background ==
The single "That's What Love Can Do" reached number 1 on the Billboard Adult R&B Songs chart in 2019. On January 4, 2021, Thicke announced the upcoming release of his first full-length album in six years, following 2014's Paula. On Earth, and in Heaven includes songs Thicke wrote about his father, Alan Thicke, who died in 2016, and Andre Harrell, who died in 2020. Thicke explained the album's inspiration: "I feel like I'm finally the person I set out to be. I'm able to laugh at anything, which I've realized is the greatest superpower. I've fully embraced it, and nothing has been better for my soul. When I saw the phrase 'On Earth, and in Heaven', I realized that's what I'm singing about: the people who aren't here and the people who are here that made me who I am. This music is the sunshine coming out after the rain".

== Track listing ==
No.	Title	Writer(s)	Length
1.	"Lucky Star"	James Gass; Nasri; Robin Thicke	3:03
2.	"Hola"	Gass; Jairus Mozee; Thicke; Kenny Wright	2:53
3.	"Lola Mia"	Larry Cox II; Chris Payton; Thicke	3:46
4.	"Gorgeous"	Thicke	0:26
5.	"The Things You Do to Me"	Aaron Camper; Cox; Gass; Thicke	3:17
6.	"Out of My Mind"	Gass; Bobby Keyes; Rich Skillz; Thicke	3:10
7.	"Beautiful"	Cox; Gianni Credle-Harrell; Gass; Skillz	4:11
8.	"Look Easy"	Chaz Jackson; Nasri; Dashawn “Happie” White; Dre Pinckney; Ben Spivak; Thicke	3:10
9.	"Take Me Higher"	Payton; Thicke; Pharrell Williams	4:04
10.	"Forever Mine"	Larry Devont Dorn; Gass; Keyes; Thicke	3:05
11.	"That's What Love Can Do"	Cox; Robert Daniels; Gass; Thicke	4:17
Total length:			35:22

== Charts ==
Chart performance for On Earth, and in Heaven
Chart (2021)	Peak position
US Top Current Album Sales (Billboard)	93
