= Wanna Love You Girl =

Single by Robin Thicke featuring Pharrell

from the album The Evolution of Robin Thicke
- Released: August 9, 2005
- Length: 4:27
- Label: Star Trak; Interscope
- Songwriters: Robin Thicke; Pharrell Williams
- Producer: The Neptunes

Robin Thicke singles chronology
"Brand New Jones" (2003)	"Wanna Love You Girl" (2005)	"Shooter" (2006)

Pharrell singles chronology
"Let's Get Blown" (2004)	"Wanna Love U Girl" (2005)	"Can I Have It Like That" (2005)

"Wanna Love You Girl" is a song by American singer Robin Thicke featuring Pharrell Williams. It was written by both artists for Thicke's second studio album The Evolution of Robin Thicke (2006). It was released on August 9, 2005 as the album's lead single. There is also a remix for the song, that features two new verses from American rapper Busta Rhymes.

== Conception ==
Co-writer Pharrell Williams was at first reluctant to record with Thicke, feeling the then forthcoming album was good enough on its own telling Vibe, "I thought his album was so dope already. I didn't think it was necessary." and stating to MTV, "I felt like it didn't need anything from me,[...]The quality, the musicality, it's just upper-echelon." Label executive Jimmy Iovine advocated the pairing, believing it would be a favorable association for Thicke in the eyes of an audience not yet familiar with his work. With Iovine's support, the two agreed to go forward with the collaboration.

== Charts ==
"Wanna Love You Girl" was officially released August 9, 2005. While expected to be a big hit, it failed to chart on the US Billboard Hot 100 and only peaked at number 65 on Billboard's Hot R&B/Hip-Hop Songs chart.

== Music video ==
A music video was for "Wanna Love You Girl" was directed by Hype Williams and produced by Tracey Cuesta. Filmed in the Dominican Republic in August 2005. This video was shot with mostly natural lighting using mirrors and bounce boards as the locations were so remote that there were no cables available long enough to connect to the generator. Some of the models were brought from Mexico, Trinidad and Tobago, and two were local models from the Dominican Republic. This video was commissioned by Interscope for Star Trak. Pharrell was flown into the area of the location and then brought by boat to the beach as the roads were too dangerous for access after a hard rain the night before his performance shot. Thicke was also brought by boat to the beach locations and had to be driven in by 4WD to the waterfalls.

== Remix ==
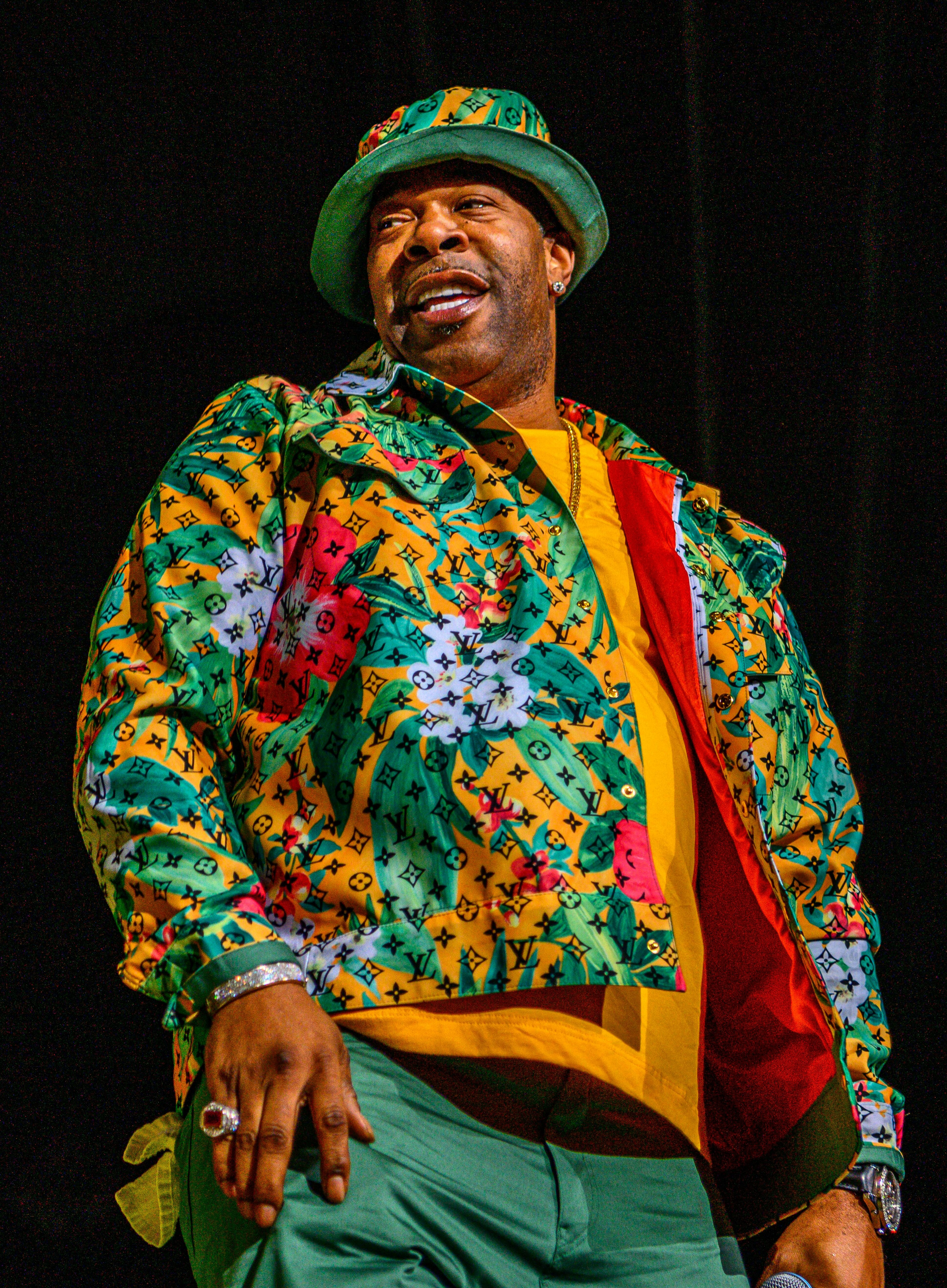
Busta Rhymes co-stars in the remix video for "Wanna Love You Girl."

Although the connection with Pharrell did not help propel the single to great chart success as anticipated, it did become a minor hit on urban radio and a popular song in clubs. It was at a club in Miami that it first caught the ear of Busta Rhymes, who was impressed by the people's frenzied reaction to it when it was played. Shortly after, Busta acquired the instrumental and recorded his own verses. The remix began appearing on mixtapes and generated enough interest that Thicke, Busta Rhymes, and Spliff Star went on to shoot an official music video for the remix which was released in the summer of 2006.

== Charts ==
Weekly chart performance for "Wanna Love You Girl"
Chart (2005–06)	Peak position
US Hot R&B/Hip-Hop Songs (Billboard)	65
