= Shooter (song) =

Single by Lil Wayne featuring Robin Thicke

from the album Tha Carter II and Like Father, Like Son (Bonus Disc)
- Released: April 9, 2006
- Recorded: 2005
- Studio: CMR Studios, New Orleans, Louisiana
- Genre: Hip hop; R&B
- Length: 4:35
- Label: Cash Money; Universal; Star Trak; Interscope
- Songwriters: Dwayne Carter; Robin Thicke
- Producer: Robin Thicke

Lil Wayne singles chronology
"Holla at Me" (2006)	"Shooter" (2006)	"Gimme That (Remix)" (2006)

Robin Thicke singles chronology
"Wanna Love U Girl" (2006)	"Shooter" (2006)	"Lost Without U" (2006)

"Shooter" is the third single from Lil Wayne's fifth studio album Tha Carter II featuring Robin Thicke. The song was also featured on the Like Father, Like Son bonus disc. The song samples the electric piano from Vic Juris' "Horizon Drive". It is a remake of Thicke's "Oh Shooter", from his first album A Beautiful World, which was inspired by Thicke's real-life experience of being caught in a bank robbery when he was 18.

== Music video ==
Directed by Benny Boom, the video is an interpretation of the 1986 Run-DMC video "Walk This Way", with Thicke and Wayne in neighboring apartments representing R&B and Dirty South respectively. The video shows both artists' different lifestyles as they begin to overlap each other, culminating in both artists performing onstage.

== In popular culture ==
It was featured in the 2008 film Rambo.

== Charts ==
Chart (2006)	Peak position
US Hot R&B/Hip-Hop Songs (Billboard)	97
