= Calling All Hearts (song) =

2014 single by DJ Cassidy

Single by DJ Cassidy featuring Robin Thicke and Jessie J
- Released: February 2014 [US] 20 April 2014 [UK]
- Recorded: 2013
- Genre: Disco; funk
- Length: 4:48
- Label: Columbia
- Songwriters: Cassidy Podell; Jessica Cornish; Claude Kelly; Gregory Cohen

DJ Cassidy singles chronology
"Calling All Hearts" (2014)	"Make the World Go Round" (2014)

Robin Thicke singles chronology
"Feel Good" (2013)	"Calling All Hearts" (2014)	"Get Her Back" (2014)

Jessie J singles chronology
"Thunder" (2013)	"Calling All Hearts" (2014)	"Bang Bang" (2014)

"Calling All Hearts" is a song by American producer DJ Cassidy, featuring vocals from American singer-songwriter, musician and actor Robin Thicke, and English singer-songwriter Jessie J. The track was written by Cassidy Podell, Jessica Cornish, Claude Kelly and Gregory Cohen. It was released in the United States in February 2014 and in the United Kingdom on 20 April 2014 as a digital download. The song has charted in Belgium.

== Music video ==
A music video to accompany the release of "Calling All Hearts" was first released onto YouTube on 4 March 2014 at a total length of six minutes and thirty-five seconds. The X-directed video was shot in London and features a 13-piece band, performing on a 52 square-foot pink lacquer heart-shaped stage. British singer Jessie J cozies up to Robin Thicke, while Cassidy rocks the CDJs in a lime green tuxedo jacket and his signature 1920s boater hat.

== Track listing ==
Digital download
No.	Title	Length
1.	"Calling All Hearts" (feat. Robin Thicke & Jessie J)	4:48

== Charts ==
Chart (2014)	Peak position
Belgium (Ultratip Bubbling Under Flanders)	6
Belgium Dance Bubbling Under (Ultratop Flanders)	1
Belgium (Ultratip Bubbling Under Wallonia)	14
Belgium Dance (Ultratop Wallonia)	40
Ireland (IRMA)	6
Scotland Singles (OCC)	7
Slovakia Airplay (ČNS IFPI)	61
South Africa (EMA)	4
UK Singles (OCC)	6
US Dance Club Songs (Billboard)	9

== Release history ==
Region	Date	Format	Label
United Kingdom	20 April 2014	Digital download	Columbia Records
