= Can U Believe =

Single by Robin Thicke

from the album The Evolution of Robin Thicke
- Released: April 12, 2007
- Recorded: 2005
- Genre: R&B
- Length: 4:52
- Label: Star Trak; Interscope
- Songwriters: R. Thicke; R. Daniels
- Producer: Robin Thicke

Robin Thicke singles chronology
"Lost Without U" (2006)	"Can U Believe" (2007)	"Got 2 Be Down" (2007)

"Can U Believe" is the third single from Robin Thicke's second studio album The Evolution of Robin Thicke. It was released to Urban AC radio on April 12, 2007. Originally "Got 2 Be Down" was expected to be the 3rd single but due to Faith Evans' pregnancy the plans for the release of the single were scrapped even though the song had already begun receiving airplay. "Got 2 Be Down" was later released as the album's fourth single.

== Chart performance ==
The single, to date, has peaked at number fifteen on Billboard's Hot R&B/Hip-Hop Singles & Tracks. It debuted on the Billboard Hot 100 at number one hundred in the chart week of August 18. In September 2007, the song re-entered the Billboard Hot 100 at #99. "Can U Believe" peaked at number twelve on the Hit Las Vegas R&B chart in May 2007.

Chart (2007–2008)	Peak position
US Billboard Hot 100	99
US Billboard Hot R&B/Hip-Hop Songs	15
US Billboard Adult R&B Songs	2
US Billboard R&B/Hip-Hop Airplay	15
US Billboard Hot 100 Airplay	61
US Billboard Smooth Jazz Songs	18

== Music video ==
The video appeared on 106 and Park on May 9, 2007, as "The New Joint of the Day" on BET. It was directed by Benny Boom.
