= Got 2 Be Down =

Single by Robin Thicke featuring Faith Evans

from the album The Evolution of Robin Thicke
- Released: October 2, 2007
- Length: 4:35
- Label: Star Trak; Interscope
- Songwriters: Robin Thicke; James Gass; Faith Evans
- Producer: Robin Thicke

Robin Thicke singles chronology
"Can U Believe" (2007)	"Got 2 Be Down" (2007)	"Magic" (2008)

Faith Evans singles chronology
"Tru Love" (2006)	"Got 2 Be Down" (2007)	"Letter to B.I.G." (2009)

"Got 2 Be Down" is a song by American singer Robin Thicke featuring Faith Evans. It was written by both singers along with James Gass for Thicke's second studio album The Evolution of Robin Thicke (2006), while production was overseen by Thicke and Pro J. The song was released as the album's fourth and final single on October 2, 2007. Originally "Got 2 Be Down" was expected to be the 3rd single but due to Faith Evans' pregnancy plans the release for the single were put on hold.

== Critical reception ==
Alex Macpherson from The Guardian called the song "delicate" and summed it as "yuppie-soul sound." Spiegel criti Jonathan Fischer compared the song favorably with Marvin Gaye's "I Want You."

== Charts ==
Weekly chart performance for Got 2 Be Down"
Chart (2007–08)	Peak position
US Adult R&B Songs (Billboard)	24
US Hot R&B/Hip-Hop Songs (Billboard)	60
US R&B/Hip-Hop Airplay (Billboard)	60
