= C-Side =

American hip hop group

- Origin: Atlanta, Georgia, U.S.
- Genres: Hip hop
- Years active: 2001–present
- Label: 17.20 Entertainment-PeachTree Music Group
- Members: Kenny Kold; KingDarius TheGreat (Joe Gator); Bo-Q

C-Side is a hip hop group composed of rappers Kenny Kold, KingDarius TheGreat fka ( Joe Gator), and Bo-Q. The group's single, Myspace Freak featuring Jazze Pha originally produced by Hit James, is widely considered and credited with being the first song to go viral in the history of music. A follow up single Boyfriend/Girlfriend” featuring Keyshia Cole and written by Gator peaked at number 72 on the Billboard Hot 100 and number 42 on the Billboard Pop 100. A third single, "Let's Make a Movie", was released later in 2008. The group is currently independent.

== Singles ==
Year	Title	Chart positions			Album
Year	Title	Hot 100	U.S. R&B	Pop 100	Album
2007	"Myspace Freak"	—	—	—	Class in Session: The Boyfriend/Girlfriend EP
2007	"Boyfriend/Girlfriend" (featuring Flaire Jones)	—	118	—	Class in Session: The Boyfriend/Girlfriend EP
2008	"Boyfriend/Girlfriend" (Remix) (featuring Keyshia Cole)	72	105	42	
2009	"Let's Make a Movie"	—	—	—	
2009	"Text Msg"	—	—	—	
