= Bobby Keyes (guitarist) =

American songwriter

- Born: September 1953 (age 72); Saugus, Massachusetts, United States
- Genres: Instrumental rock, jazz, blues
- Instrument: Guitar
- Years active: 1959–present
- Label: Thrillionaire
- Website: Bobby Keyes

Bobby Keyes (born September 1953) is an American guitarist and songwriter from Saugus, Massachusetts. He has played as a session guitarist for a variety of artists, and has written songs for artists including New Kids on the Block. In the early 2000s he was back in Boston, releasing a series of instrumental solo recordings.

== Equipment ==
Keyes often plays a 1959 Gibson ES-330. He uses a 1964 Fender Vibrolux Reverb amplifier.

== Discography ==
Solo

- Lucky Stereo (1999)
- Lady Luck (2004)
- Cloud 9 (2014)
- Dojogobo (2014)

With Tommy Page

- Paintings in My Mind (1990)

With Jerry Lee Lewis

- Young Blood (1995)

With Jordan Knight

- Jordan Knight (1999)

With Joey McIntyre

- Stay the Same (1999)

With Mýa

- Fear of Flying (2000)

With Robin Thicke

- A Beautiful World (2003)
- The Evolution of Robin Thicke (2007)
- Something Else (2008)
- Love After War (2011)
- Blurred Lines (2013)
- Paula (2014)

With The Mystix

- Satisfy You (2006)
- Blue Morning (2007)
- Down to the Shore (2009)
- Mighty Tone (2012)

Movie Soundtracks

- Dick Tracy (1990)
- For the Love of Movies: The Story of American Film Criticism (2009)
