= Robin Thicke =

American singer, songwriter, and record producer (born 1977)

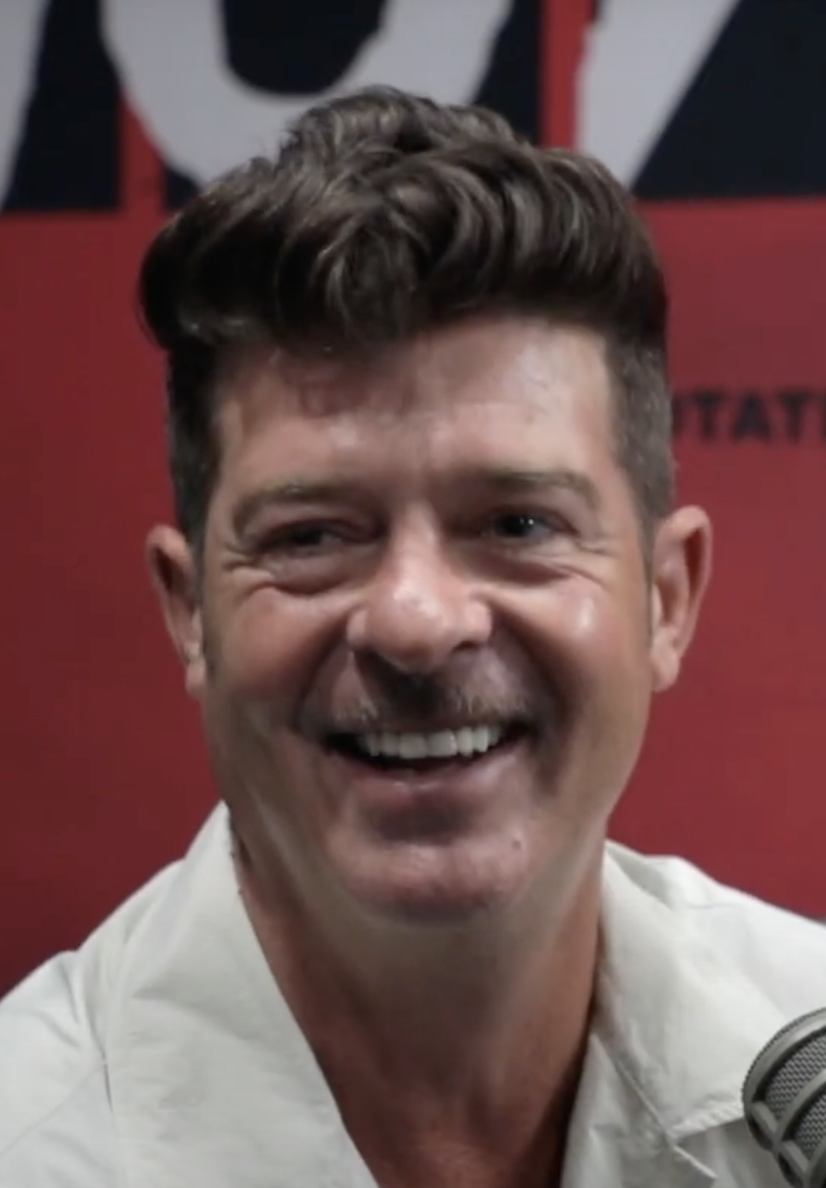
- Thicke in 2024
- Born: Robin Alan Thicke; March 10, 1977 (age 49); Los Angeles, California, U.S.
- Occupations: Singer; songwriter; record producer; actor
- Years active: 1994–present (as a singer)
- Works: Discography; production
- Spouse(s): Paula Patton (m. 2005; div. 2015) April Love Geary (m. 2025)
- Children: 4
- Parents: Alan Thicke; Gloria Loring
- Relatives: Todd Thicke (half-uncle)
- Awards: Full list
- Musical career
- Genres: R&B; soul; pop
- Instruments: Vocals; keyboards; piano; bass guitar; guitar; drums
- Labels: NuAmerica; EMPIRE; Star Trak; Geffen; Interscope
- Website: robinthicke.com

Robin Alan Thicke (born March 10, 1977) is an American singer, songwriter and record producer. He is best known for his 2013 single "Blurred Lines" (featuring T.I. and Pharrell Williams), which peaked atop the Billboard Hot 100, received diamond certification by the Recording Industry Association of America (RIAA), and remains one of the best-selling singles of all time. At the 56th Annual Grammy Awards, it received nominations for Record of the Year and Best Pop Duo/Group Performance.

Thicke is a son of actress Gloria Loring and actor Alan Thicke. Prior to pursuing his recording career, he produced and wrote songs for R&B singer Brian McKnight, who led the then-unknown singer to do so for other R&B acts including Brandy Norwood, Color Me Badd, Brownstone, 3T, Chanté Moore, and Kevon Edmonds. By the age of 16, he signed with Interscope Records to release his blue-eyed soul-inspired debut studio album, A Beautiful World (2002), which was commercially unsuccessful. He then signed with Pharrell Williams' Star Trak Entertainment in 2005 to release his second album, The Evolution of Robin Thicke (2006). A commercial success, the album debuted at number five on the Billboard 200 and spawned the single "Lost Without U", which peaked at number 14 on the Billboard Hot 100.

His third album, Something Else (2008), peaked at number three on the Billboard 200, and was supported by the modest hit "Magic". His fourth, Sex Therapy: The Session (2009), peaked at number nine and spawned the single "Sex Therapy", while his fifth, Love After War (2011), peaked at number 22. His sixth album, Blurred Lines (2013) was preceded by the single of the same name, and debuted atop both the Billboard 200 and UK Albums Chart despite mixed critical reception. Since 2019, Thicke has been a panelist on the Fox musical competition show The Masked Singer. In 2026, Thicke became the new band leader on Name That Tune.

== Life and career ==
=== 1977–1998: Early years and family ===
Thicke was born in Los Angeles, California, on March 10, 1977. His parents are American actress-singer Gloria Loring, who appeared on the NBC daytime drama Days of Our Lives, and Canadian actor Alan Thicke, known for his role on the TV sitcom Growing Pains; the duo also composed theme music such as Diff'rent Strokes and its spin-off The Facts of Life. They divorced when Thicke was 7 years old. He has an older brother, Brennan, who worked as a voice actor and voiced the titular character on the animated Dennis the Menace series, and a younger half-brother, Carter. Robin Thicke also appeared in small roles on TV shows: The Wonder Years, The New Lassie, Just the Ten of Us and several episodes of Growing Pains.

Thicke's parents were supportive of his musical inclinations; his father helped him to write and structure his first songs. According to Robin Thicke, his father would not pay for him (then in his early teens) and his vocal group, As One, to record a professionally produced demo tape, wanting Robin to focus on his studies and graduate from school before committing to the pursuit of a career in music. The demo ultimately was paid for by jazz vocalist Al Jarreau, an uncle of one of the group members. His demo made its way to R&B singer Brian McKnight, who was impressed enough by Thicke to invite him into the studio to work with him. Thicke was signed to McKnight's production company; "Anyway", a song co-written with Thicke, was featured on McKnight's second album I Remember You. Thicke's peers jokingly nicknamed him "Brian McWhite". It was Thicke's association with McKnight, who Thicke counts as one of his first mentors, that led him to his acquaintance with Jimmy Iovine and helped him to land his first recording contract with Interscope Records at the age of 16. Thicke later joined a hip hop duo with future Beverly Hills 90210 actor Brian Austin Green.

Thicke moved out on his own at the age of 17, during his senior year of high school, earning a living and supporting himself as a professional record producer and songwriter. Thicke has noted that while his parents did not attempt to dissuade him from his desire to be in the music industry, their own experience with the nature of the entertainment business made them leery in the beginning. As Thicke's list of credits grew so did his parents' confidence in his decision.

While initially signed as a singer and artist in his own right, Thicke first made a name for himself within the industry as a songwriter and producer for other artists before releasing and performing his own music. Among his work for other artists, Thicke co-wrote "Love Is on My Side" on Brandy's eponymous debut album; he also wrote for 3T's Brotherhood, and collaborated with Jordan Knight, Jimmy Jam and Terry Lewis on several songs in Knight's 1999 album Jordan Knight including the Billboard top 10 hit "Give It to You". According to Thicke, Knight also invested in the ability of the young songwriter early on by purchasing studio equipment for him.

He also co-wrote the song "When You Put Your Hands on Me" for Christina Aguilera's debut album and co-wrote and produced three songs for Mýa's sophomore release, Fear of Flying. In 1999, Thicke co-wrote the song "Fall Again" with Walter Afanasieff, which was intended to be a track on Michael Jackson's 2001 album Invincible, but it failed to be presented as a completed song. The demo Michael recorded in 1999 was released on November 16, 2004, as an album track of his limited edition box set The Ultimate Collection. As an artist, he recorded and performed solely under his surname, Thicke. He would continue to do so until 2005.

=== 1999–2003: A Beautiful World and early success ===
At the age of 22, after an involvement with Tommy Mottola and Epic Records following the end of his first deal with Interscope, Thicke resolved himself to work chiefly on material for his debut album, initially titled Cherry Blue Skies, planning to use his own money to fund the project. As Thicke told Billboard, "I decided I was going to save money to make my album, and I hoped to offer it to labels–take it or leave it–so I didn't have to negotiate how to make my music." While piecing his album together, Thicke began working with veteran producer and label executive Andre Harrell and, under his guidance, eventually signed with Interscope for a second time as part of Harrell's and Kenneth "Babyface" Edmonds' Nu America imprint label in 2001.

In 2002, Thicke released his debut single "When I Get You Alone". The track samples Walter Murphy's "A Fifth of Beethoven", which itself is a disco rendition of Beethoven's Fifth Symphony. The music video for the song received some rotation on MTV2 and BET's Rated Next and was spun moderately on pop and urban radio, peaking at number 49 on Radio & Records Pop chart. Globally, however, "When I Get You Alone" became a chart success when it peaked in the Top 20 in Australia, Belgium, and Italy, and reached the Top 10 of the singles charts in New Zealand and the Top 3 of the Dutch Top 40 in the Netherlands.

The moderate success was enough to signal the release of the album in 2002 with its name changed to A Beautiful World. Despite the release of a second single, "Brand New Jones", the album received very little promotion and debuted at number 152 on the Billboard 200 albums chart, selling 119,000 copies as of January 2012. A Beautiful World fell below the label's commercial expectations. The album's under-performance troubled Thicke personally, but it proved enough to make him a wanted collaborator. Thicke has cited Mary J. Blige, Usher, and Lil Wayne, among others, as those who subsequently reached out to him. Reflecting on A Beautiful World in 2013, Usher told The New York Times, "I was blown away — I thought Beatles, Earth Wind & Fire, Shuggie Otis, Marvin Gaye — all in one album. [Robin's] got a soul you can't buy, man."

Runner-up Blake Lewis performed "When I Get You Alone" during the 2007 season of American Idol when the Top 3 chose a song to sing. Lewis has often put Robin Thicke in his list of musical influences in interviews and on the American Idol website. The song was also performed by Blaine Anderson (played by Darren Criss) on Glee during the Season 2 episode "Silly Love Songs".

=== 2004–2007: The Evolution of Robin Thicke and commercial breakthrough ===
Following A Beautiful World, Thicke was keen to begin work on his sophomore album but financial and creative disagreements stemming from the performance of his first album led to a several month-long stalemate between Robin and his record label. Regarding this time in his career, Thicke said, "The label pretty much lost faith in my ability to sell. It became a question of, 'Where does he fit? Is he not rock or pop enough? Is he not soul enough?'" Pharrell Williams, having established a distribution deal with Interscope for his record label, Star Trak, expressed to Jimmy Iovine his interest in Thicke, whose talent he thought of highly.

Signed to Star Trak in 2005, Thicke continued work on his second album, The Evolution of Robin Thicke. The first single, "Wanna Love U Girl", featured producer Williams and charted successfully on urban radio in the United Kingdom. In 2006, a remix version of the song was filmed with rapper Busta Rhymes. Nearly a year after the single was released, the album was released on October 3, 2006. To promote it, Thicke toured with India.Arie, then opened for John Legend in late 2006.

The video for his second single, the ballad "Lost Without U", was released in fall 2006. The song began appearing on Billboard R&B charts in November of that year. With the assistance of radio airplay, it became Thicke's breakout hit. It reached number 14 on the Billboard Hot 100 and spending 11 weeks at number one on the Billboard Hot R&B/Hip-Hop Songs, making him the first white male artist to top that chart since George Michael did so in 1988 with "One More Try".

In the February 24, 2007, issue of Billboard, Thicke concurrently topped four Billboard charts: Top R&B/Hip-Hop Albums, Hot R&B/Hip-Hop Songs, Hot R&B/Hip-Hop Airplay, and Adult R&B Songs, a feat he would duplicate in the March 17 issue. Following its re-release as a Deluxe Edition (with three new bonus tracks) on February 13, 2007, the album peaked at number five on the Billboard 200. On March 23, 2007, The Evolution of Robin Thicke was certified Platinum by the RIAA. With album sales of over 1.5 million copies sold domestically, The Evolution of Robin Thicke became a commercial success in the United States.

Thicke and his record label Interscope soon considered potential tracks to be released as the album's next and third single. Thicke's preference was the track "Can U Believe", which peaked at number 16 on the Billboard Hot R&B/Hip-Hop Songs and at number 99 on the Billboard Hot 100 chart. On October 2, 2007, the track "Got 2 Be Down" was released as the album's fourth official single. The single peaked at number 60 on Billboard's Hot R&B/Hip-Hop Singles & Tracks.

On April 19, 2007, Thicke performed on The Oprah Winfrey Show, singing "Lost Without U". He returned to the show a month later, on May 29, performing "Complicated" and Oprah Winfrey's favorite song from the album, "Would That Make U Love Me", while also promoting Beyoncé's tour, on which he would be an opening act. Winfrey revealed that Thicke's initial appearance garnered a strong reaction, noting that people called the show to say that they didn't know he would be on. Winfrey explained, "So what I wanted to do was to accommodate all of the people who missed it the first time ... In order to do that, I had to do something I've never done before. I got on the phone and asked this very special guest if he would consider coming back."

In late 2007, Thicke finished promotion for the album as the featured opening act for the North American leg of Beyoncé's US tour, The Beyoncé Experience. Other notable performances in support of the album and its single "Lost Without U" include the 2007 BET Awards, The 2007 MOBO Awards, American Idol, and the 2007 Soul Train Music Awards. He also performed a one-off UK concert at KOKO in London on September 24, 2007.

=== 2008–2010: Something Else and Sex Therapy ===
Thicke released his third solo album, titled Something Else, on September 30, 2008. It debuted at number three on the Billboard 200 charts and sold 137,000 copies in the first week. The first single from the album, "Magic", was a further expansion of the R&B sound that powered his 2006 breakthrough, The Evolution of Robin Thicke. "Magic" went on to peak at number two on the Adult R&B chart, number six on the Hot R&B/Hip-Hop chart and number 59 on the Billboard Hot 100 chart. He followed this success with the second single, "The Sweetest Love", which peaked at number two on the Adult R&B chart and number 20 on the Hot R&B/Hip-Hop chart.

On February 8, 2009, at the 51st Annual Grammy Awards, Thicke took the stage alongside Lil Wayne to perform their song "Tie My Hands" from the Grammy-winning album Tha Carter III (the song was also featured on Something Else) which was followed by Thicke and Lil Wayne participating in a medley of "Big Chief" and "My Feet Can't Fail Me Now" led by jazz musicians Allen Toussaint, Terence Blanchard, and the Dirty Dozen Brass Band in tribute to New Orleans and the victims of Hurricane Katrina.

Thicke appeared on an episode of ABC's The Bachelor to perform "Magic" and "The Sweetest Love" for the remaining female contestants. Thicke wrote and produced a track for the movie Precious in which his wife Paula Patton also starred, though it did not appear on the soundtrack and remains unreleased. He co-headlined a U.S. tour with Jennifer Hudson, which began March 31, 2009, in Albany, New York, and wrapped up 25 shows later in Biloxi, Mississippi. At the start of the tour, Thicke released "Dreamworld" as the official third single from Something Else. As of April 2009, Something Else has shifted over 435,000 units in the U.S.

Seven months after the release of Something Else, Billboard.com announced that Thicke would release his fourth studio album in the fall of 2009, his first to not be mainly self-produced. The album, titled Sex Therapy, had its release date postponed to winter, on December 15, 2009. The first single from the album was the title track, produced by Polow Da Don, which in March 2010 became Thicke's second song to top the Hot R&B/Hip-Hop Songs chart. The lead single for international markets was "Rollacosta" featuring singer Estelle. The second U.S. single was "It's in the Mornin'" featuring Snoop Dogg. "Shakin' It 4 Daddy", featuring rapper Nicki Minaj, produced by Polow Da Don, was supposed to be released as a single at some point, however, its release was eventually canceled.

Speaking of the musical background to Sex Therapy, Thicke told Pete Lewis – Deputy Editor of Blues & Soul – "I'm always gonna have the influence of Marvin Gaye, Stevie Wonder and Al Green in my music. But with this album I also wanted to show my hip hop side. I grew up listening to Run-DMC and N.W.A and Biggie and Pac and Jay-Z... So I really wanted to make a record that represented how much that music has influenced me." Earlier in 2009, on October 14, Leighton Meester's debut single "Somebody to Love", featuring Thicke, was released. Thicke told MTV he hoped to have Lil Wayne on the album. He also pointed out that he was featured on Lil Wayne's last two albums Tha Carter II (2005) and The Carter III, and Lil Wayne was on his last two albums. "We're kind of good luck charms for each other."

Thicke appeared on ABC's New Year's Rockin' Eve on January 1, 2010, and performed three songs in Las Vegas, in a pre-recorded segment. Also in 2010, it was confirmed that he, along with Melanie Fiona, would feature on The Freedom Tour with Alicia Keys. As of October 2011, the album has sold 289,000 copies in the United States. On February 5, 2010, Thicke participated in BET's SOS Saving Ourselves: Help For Haiti telethon concert, held in response to the 2010 Haiti earthquake.

=== 2011–2012: Love After War and Duets ===
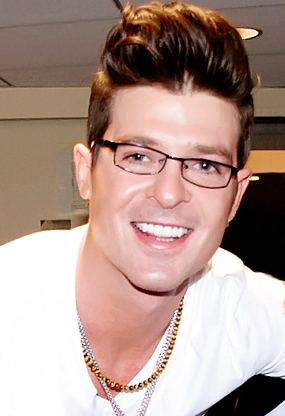
Thicke in 2012

During 2011, Thicke was confirmed to go on tour with Jennifer Hudson, with whom he toured in 2009. Later that year, Robin Thicke released his fifth studio album, Love After War, on December 6, 2011. The album debuted at number twenty-two on the Billboard 200 and number six on the "Top R&B/Hip-Hop Albums" selling 41,000 in its first week. In an interview to promote the album, Thicke said that a lot of the inspiration for the album came from his family.

The album has produced three singles. The first is the title track, "Love After War" released on October 11, 2011, and has peaked at number fourteen on the "Hot R&B/Hip-Hop Songs" chart and topped the Adult R&B chart making it his second song after "Lost Without U" to top that chart. The music video for the song premiered November 21, 2011. The music video features his wife Paula Patton and consists of Thicke making up with his wife after a fight.

The second single is "Pretty Lil' Heart", which features Lil Wayne and was released on November 8, 2011. The music video for that premiered on March 2, 2012. It peaked at number fifty-one on the Hot R&B/Hip-Hop Songs chart. On May 31, 2012, Thicke released a video for his promo single, which was a cover of the Whitney Houston classic "Exhale (Shoop Shoop"). The third official single is "All Tied Up" which was released to Urban AC radio on April 10, 2012. The music video premiered on June 7, 2012, on Vevo.

Thicke performed "Love After War" on the 2011 Soul Train Music Awards and later returned to the stage to sing "Reasons", trading verses with Joe and Eric Benét, as part of an all-star tribute to Legend Award recipients Earth, Wind & Fire.

Thicke appeared on season 2 of NBC's The Voice as a guest adviser/mentor to the contestants on Adam Levine's team.

In July 2012, Thicke made his feature film debut starring alongside Jaime Pressly in Jimbo Lee's Abby in the Summer, produced by Gabriel Cowan, John Suits, Dallas Sonnier and Jack Heller. The film, shot in 2012, was released in 2014 under the title Making the Rules.

Thicke served as a judge on the ABC television show Duets which premiered May 24, 2012, and which also featured John Legend, Jennifer Nettles, and Kelly Clarkson. The judges doubled as mentors who searched for singers across the country (Robin Thicke's singers being Olivia Chisholm and Alexis Foster) to duet with them as they perform in front of a live studio audience. The premiere episode drew in 7 million viewers. The show went live June 28, 2012, allowing the viewers to vote for their favorite contestants.

=== 2013–2014: Blurred Lines and Real Husbands of Hollywood ===
On March 26, 2013, Thicke released "Blurred Lines" featuring T.I. and Pharrell as the lead single to his sixth studio album, also titled Blurred Lines. The video, featuring models Emily Ratajkowski, Jessi M'Bengue, and Elle Evans, was directed by Diane Martel and released on March 20, 2013, and garnered more than 1 million views in days after release on Vevo. Thicke said he had received the approval of his wife Paula Patton before shooting the video.

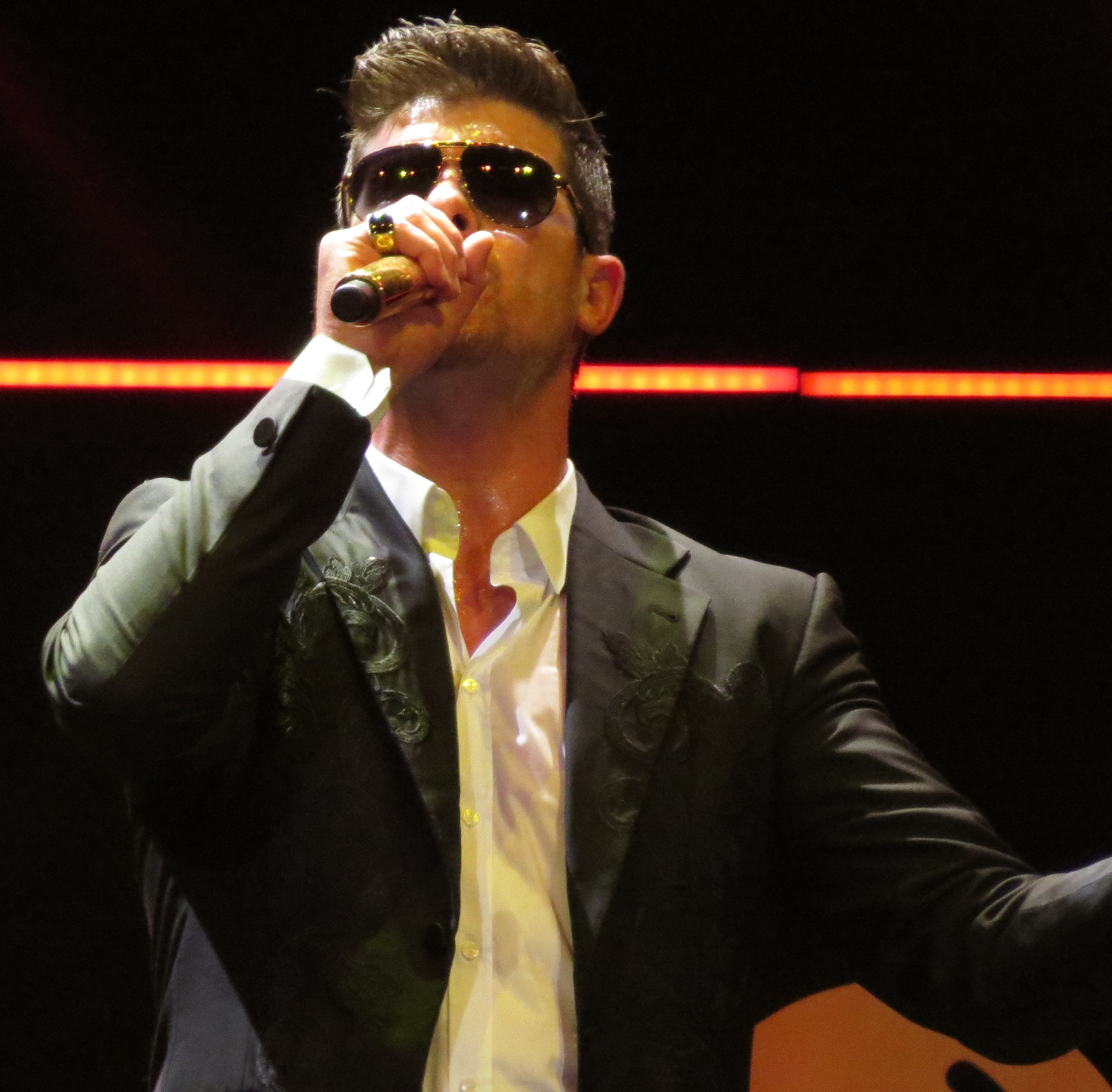
Thicke performing in December 2013

In early 2013, Thicke starred as a fictionalized version of himself alongside Kevin Hart, Boris Kodjoe, Nelly, Duane Martin, J.B. Smoove, Nick Cannon, and Cynthia McWilliams in the first season of BET's hit show Real Husbands of Hollywood. Thicke was unable to rejoin the cast for the shooting of the second season, opting instead to focus on his music. According to Thicke, "Once the song started to take off, and all this momentum was happening, and Real Husbands of Hollywood needed me for all eight weeks, I couldn't finish the album and promote the single and go over seas and do all these other things I wanted to do."

As Thicke stated to the Breakfast Club, "The album is called Blurred Lines. I've realized as I've gotten older that we all think we're living either in a black or white world, or on a straight path, but most of us are living right in between those straight lines. And everything you thought you knew, the older you get, you realize, 'Damn, I don't know nothing about this. I better pay attention, I better listen and keep learning.' So I think that, that's what I've been realizing these past few years."

He also said his attempt into a more poppy sound than his normal environment. "The last year I've been wanting to have more fun. I think I took myself very seriously as an artist and I wanted to be like Marvin Gaye, and John Lennon and Bob Marley and these great artists and songwriters that sang about love and sang about relationships," Thicke said. "And then the last year, my wife and I just really wanted to have fun again, we wanted to be young again and we wanted to dance again and go out with our friends, so I wanted to make music that reflected that culture also." The song has been a worldwide hit, has peaked at number one on the Billboard Hot 100, and has also reached number one in 13 more countries including the United Kingdom, where Blurred Lines became only the 137th record in history to surpass the one million sales mark, and the United States. The new album Blurred Lines was released on July 30, 2013.

The song and related music videos also received criticism for being misogynistic and promoting rape culture, with some critics calling the lyrics "creepy" and "rapey". In an interview for GQ magazine Thicke joked about the video, saying, "What a pleasure it is to degrade a woman. I've never gotten to do that before. I've always respected women." In response to Thicke's statement in GQ that the idea of the video was to be 'derogatory towards women', the director Diane Martel denied this was discussed on set: "That's crazy. Maybe he wasn't thinking when he said that."

During an interview with Oprah Winfrey for Oprah's Next Chapter, Thicke clarified his comment about degrading women, describing it as a "bad joke", noting that the published GQ interview did not mention that he was doing an impersonation of Will Ferrell's Ron Burgundy character while making the remark, thus not providing the sarcastic/joking context. The song's unrated music video was originally banned from YouTube before being reposted some weeks later.

On August 25, at the 2013 MTV Video Music Awards, Thicke performed "Blurred Lines" with Miley Cyrus, who famously twerked on stage, followed by "Give It 2 U" with 2 Chainz and Kendrick Lamar. During the performance, Cyrus danced in such a way as to mimic a sexual act with Thicke. Afterwards, Cyrus said that Thicke had explicitly asked her to be "as naked as possible" during the performance. According to the same source, "Thicke was angry with Cyrus for 'going too far' during the VMAs, and that he thought the 'Wrecking Ball' songstress had 'hijacked the performance.'" The performance drew negative reactions for its alleged raunchiness, sexism, racism, slut-shaming, and cultural appropriation. It became the most tweeted about event in history, with Twitter users generating 360,000 tweets about the event per minute, breaking the previous record held by Beyoncé's Super Bowl XLVII halftime show performance six months earlier.

On December 6, 2013, Thicke and T.I. performed "Blurred Lines" accompanied by Earth, Wind & Fire at The Grammy Nominations Concert Live! on CBS where it was announced that Thicke had been nominated for three Grammy Awards at the 56th Annual Grammy Awards: Best Pop Vocal Album for Blurred Lines and Record of the Year and Best Pop Duo/Group Performance for the album's single "Blurred Lines". In the same month, he was awarded the title "Sexist of the Year" by the End Violence Against Women Coalition, which has more than 60 member groups working to end sexual and domestic violence, trafficking and other forms of abuse. Thicke received twice as many votes as the poll's runner up, Prime Minister of the United Kingdom David Cameron. It was parodied many times and forbidden in many UK student unions.

On January 26, 2014, Thicke performed live with Chicago at the 56th Annual Grammy Awards, celebrating the induction of Chicago's debut album, The Chicago Transit Authority, into the Grammy Hall of Fame. Thicke and Chicago performed a medley of "Does Anybody Really Know What Time It Is?", "Beginnings", and "Saturday in the Park" ending with "Blurred Lines".

After the success of "Blurred Lines", the heirs of singer Marvin Gaye sued Thicke and Pharrell Williams, claiming that the song had plagiarised Gaye's "Got to Give It Up". Jurors awarded Gaye $7.4 million, but United States District Judge John Kronstadt reduced the sum to $5.3 million, while adding royalties.

=== 2014–2018: Paula and television appearances ===
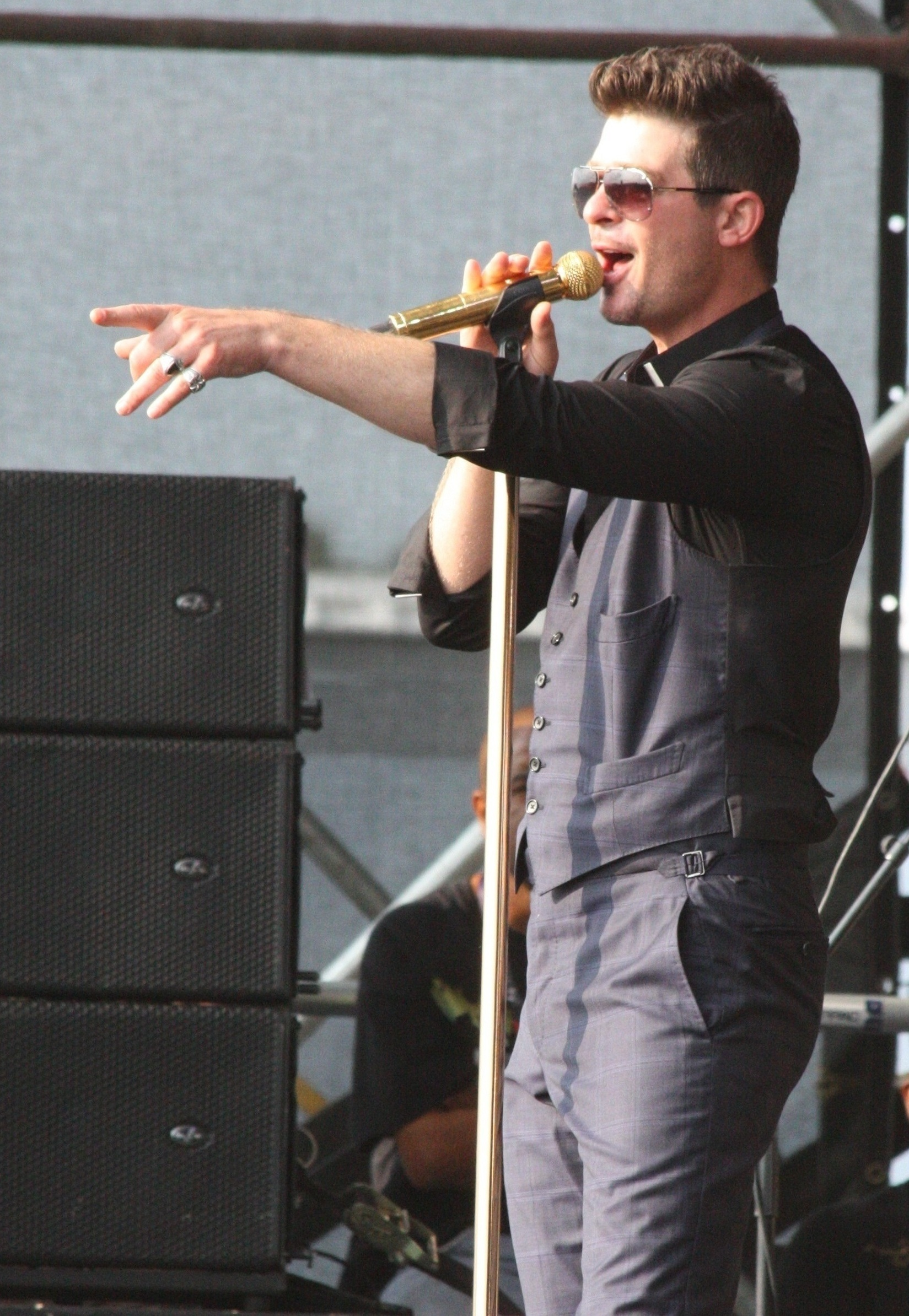
Thicke performing in 2014

In February 2014, Thicke collaborated with DJ Cassidy and British singer Jessie J to record "Calling All Hearts".

In June 2014, Thicke announced that his next album would be called Paula, dedicated to his estranged wife, Paula Patton. The lead single "Get Her Back" was released on May 19, 2014. Thicke debuted the song on the same day with a performance at the 2014 Billboard Music Awards where he also won four awards for "Blurred Lines". Thicke also appeared on the season finale of The Voice singing "Get Her Back" with finalist Josh Kaufman. Thicke then performed the song "Forever Love" at the BET Awards 2014.

At the end of June 2014, during a Q&A session on Twitter and hosted by VH1, Thicke asked followers to submit questions by using the hashtag #AskThicke. The tag was quickly overrun by people protesting his lyrics as misogynistic and criticizing his lifestyle choices, and other detractors, leading to what The Guardian called "an epic PR fail". When a Twitter user pointed out that the comments directed at Thicke were "brutal", Thicke responded: "I can handle it, I'm a big boy".

The album, originally set for a Fall release, was pushed forward and released on July 1, 2014, five weeks after the release of its lead single. Paula peaked at No. 9 on the Billboard 200, and sold 24,000 copies in its first week of release. In a 2015 interview with Jody Rosen of The New York Times, Thicke expressed both embarrassment over his public dedications and regret over giving the album a commercial release, stating, "my record company didn't want me to put it out, but they stuck by me. In hindsight, the only thing I would have done differently was, I wouldn't have promoted it or sold it. I would have given it away."

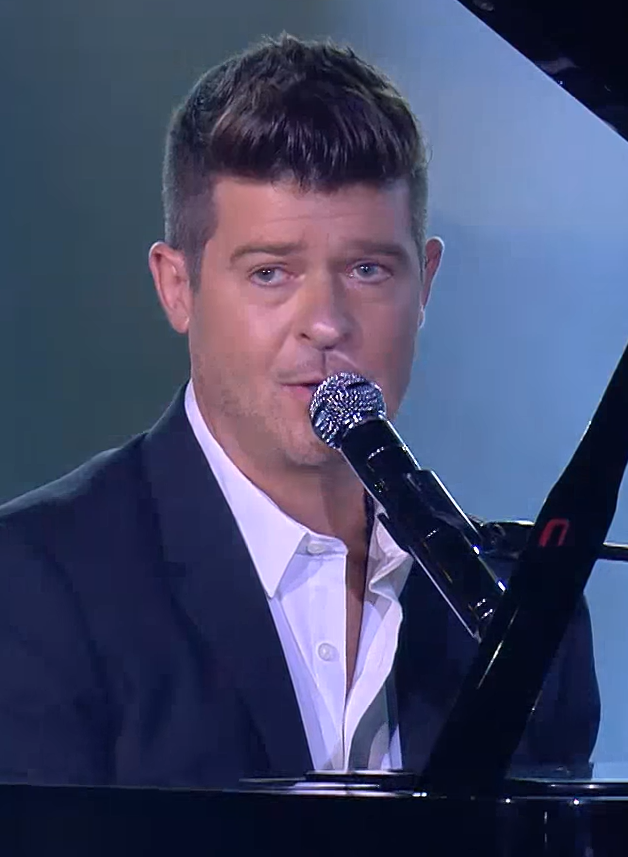
Thicke performing at the Indonesian Choice Awards in 2017

Following the release of Paula, Thicke spent several months largely away from media appearances and performing in order to focus on his personal life and to work on new music. Thicke returned to the spotlight at the BET Awards 2015 to sing the classic Smokey Robinson and The Miracles hit "Ooo Baby Baby" in tribute to Lifetime Achievement Award recipient Smokey Robinson and joined Robinson on stage for a group rendition of "My Girl" alongside Tori Kelly and Ne-Yo. On June 29, on the heels of his BET Awards performance, Thicke debuted the lyric video for his new single "Morning Sun", on Vevo followed by the official release of the single on June 30. "Morning Sun" rose to the number 4 position on the Billboard Adult R&B Songs chart becoming Thicke's 11th top 10 hit on Urban AC radio.

Speaking with Prestige Hong Kong, Thicke explained: "The new album is call[ed] Morning Sun. It's about fresh starts, new beginnings, and the heralding in of a new day. It's about the last year of my life, the time I've spent with my friends and family and especially my son." Thicke also spoke of working again with Pharrell and Timbaland as well as with new collaborators DJ Mustard, Max Martin, and Ricky Reed. Another new single "Back Together", featuring Nicki Minaj, was released on August 6, 2015. Thicke rejoined the cast of Real Husbands of Hollywood in 2016 for its fifth season. In the premiere episode, Thicke parodied his publicized personal and professional troubles including his divorce, lawsuit, drug use and poorly received album.

=== 2019–present: The Masked Singer and On Earth, and in Heaven ===
In January 2019, Thicke began appearing as a panelist on the reality competition series The Masked Singer.

After nearly eight years since their hit collaboration, "Blurred Lines", Thicke and producer Pharrell Williams reunited for the single "Take Me Higher", released on January 21, 2021. It was included on his eighth studio album, On Earth, and in Heaven, released on February 12, 2021, through his Lucky Music label in partnership with Empire Distribution. It marked his first album since 2014's Paula. Thicke explained the album's inspiration: "I feel like I'm finally the person I set out to be. I'm able to laugh at anything, which I've realized is the greatest superpower. I've fully embraced it, and nothing has been better for my soul. When I saw the phrase 'On Earth, and in Heaven', I realized that's what I'm singing about: the people who aren't here and the people who are here that made me who I am. This music is the sunshine coming out after the rain".

Thicke collected his sixth No. 1 on Billboard's Adult R&B Airplay chart with "Look Easy" on the list dated for August 21, 2021.

In early October 2021, fragments from model and actress Emily Ratajkowski's forthcoming book, My Body, were leaked online, where she claimed that Thicke groped her breasts without her consent in 2013 during the filming of the music video for the song "Blurred Lines". According to Time magazine and other sources, Ratajkowski was frustrated about the leaked chapter and said it was taken "out of the essay's context". She said, "It's been hard for me. I really like to have control over my image and I wrote this book of essays to share the whole story and all sides of it, and I feel like it turns into a clickbait frenzy and all of a sudden words like 'sexual assault' and 'allegations' are getting thrown around rather than people reading the actual essay... I'm just looking forward to when people will be able hear things in my own words." Thicke has not publicly responded. In 2025, Thicke performed at the "Smiles Under the Stars" charity gala for the Giving A Smile Foundation.

== Artistry ==
=== Influences ===
Thicke is a self-taught pianist. Some of the first songs he learned to play and sing along with as a child were by gospel artists such as Commissioned, Take 6, and John P. Kee, studying their licks and harmonies. Thicke has drawn influence from a variety of artists including James Brown, Stevie Wonder, Marvin Gaye, Sting, Prince, Alanis Morissette, The Beatles, John Lennon, Bob Marley and Michael Jackson. Thicke has said that he considers himself a soulful singer but does not like his music being described as "blue-eyed soul", finding the term too pigeonholing.

"You know, people don't always know why they connect with things. Like some people wanna be a fireman when they're young. And for some reason hip hop, gospel, R&B and soul music just always felt like home to me. I was listening to Kurtis Blow at 8; N.W.A at 12; Jodeci and Mary J. at 14; then Boyz II Men and Babyface soon after."

— Robin Thicke interview by Pete Lewis, Blues & Soul, November 2008.

=== Musical style, songwriting, and producing ===
Thicke's music had been mainly described as R&B, soul, and pop. Thicke began his career by writing and producing songs for popular artists. He co-wrote and produced the Color Me Badd song "Sexual Capacity" in 1996. He also co-wrote on the self-titled debut album by Christina Aguilera, which sold 17 million copies worldwide. Albums on which Thicke's songwriting, producing, and other contributions have been featured include: Brandy's Brandy, Brian Mcknight's I Remember You, Brownstone's Still Climbing, Jordan Knight, Chante Moore's This Moment Is Mine, Marc Anthony, P!nk's Can't Take Me Home, Ronan Keating's Ronan, Mýa's Fear of Flying, BBMak's Sooner or Later, both Will Young's Friday's Child and Keep On.

The Thicke original "When I Get You Alone" was performed by Guy Sebastian, the winner of the first Australian Idol 2003, during the competition and at the Idol grand finale. "When I Get You Alone" was a popular song choice for Sebastian; he put the live idol performance on his four-times platinum debut single "Angels Brought Me Here"; it was the fastest selling single in Australia debuting at number one and immediately breaking an ARIA record. In 2004, Thicke co-wrote and produced "Out With My Baby" with Guy Sebastian, along with being credited for work on two additional songs from Sebastian's second album, Beautiful Life. The single, "Out With My Baby", became a platinum selling No. 1 hit for Sebastian on the ARIA Singles Charts. During this same year, he co-wrote and produced a song with the singer and actress Raven-Symoné for the album This Is My Time, with the song "Set Me Free".

Thicke co-wrote "Can U Handle It?" for Usher's 2004 album, Confessions, with backing vocals provided by Paula Patton. Confessions would go on to sell 20 million copies worldwide and win the Grammy Award for Best Contemporary R&B Album in 2005. Thicke co-wrote and produced the song "Tie My Hands" on Lil Wayne's multi-platinum selling album Tha Carter III which went on to win Best Rap Album. Thicke wrote and produced the song "Giving Myself" for Jennifer Hudson's eponymous debut album, which went on to win Best R&B Album.

In total, albums on which Thicke has been credited for his work (in capacities including writer, producer, arranger, vocalist, and musician) have sold over 60 million copies worldwide.

Throughout his career, Thicke has worked most frequently with long-time production partner Pro Jay (James Gass), whose contributions have appeared on all of Thicke's own studio albums and whose name can be found alongside Thicke's in writing and producing credits for other artists. Thicke also often enlists veteran session guitarist and songwriter Bobby Keyes as well as keyboardist and music director Larry Cox to contribute to his projects.

=== Collaborations ===
In 2005, Thicke performed as a guest on the remix of Will Smith's song "Switch".

In 2007, Thicke appeared on 50 Cent's album Curtis on a song called "Follow My Lead". The following year, he worked with Ashanti on her fourth studio album, The Declaration.

Thicke also appeared on R. Kelly's Untitled on the track "Pregnant" which also features Tyrese and The-Dream.

In 2008, Thicke was enlisted by producer Polow da Don to play piano on the hit Usher track "Love in This Club", which reached the No. 1 position on the Billboard Hot 100.

Thicke was featured along with a number of his contemporaries on the 2010 release Q Soul Bossa Nostra, an album in tribute to famed composer and music producer Quincy Jones (who also executive produced the project), which consisted of reinterpretations of Jones' work.

In 2014, Thicke joined Jessie J on the DJ Cassidy produced song "Calling All Hearts".

Thicke was featured along with bassist Verdine White on Flo Rida's "I Don't Like It, I Love It" in 2015 which found success on several international charts and peaked among the top 10 singles in seven countries.

== Personal life ==
At age 14, Robin Thicke first met actress Paula Patton, who was then 15, in 1991 at an under-21 hip-hop club called Balistyx (co-founded and co-hosted by David Faustino) on the Sunset Strip in Los Angeles, when he asked her to dance. They were married in 2005 and their son was born in April 2010. Thicke and Patton separated in February 2014, after 21 years together and almost nine years of marriage. On October 9, 2014, Patton officially filed for divorce, which was finalized on March 20, 2015. In January 2017, a judge denied Patton's request to limit Thicke's custody after she accused him of child abuse. Later that month, Patton was granted sole custody and a restraining order that included their son Julian and her mother Joyce Patton against Thicke after she accused him of domestic violence, infidelity, and drug and alcohol addiction. Patton and Thicke reached a custody agreement in August 2017.

In 2014, Thicke met April Love Geary at a party. They first appeared in public together in 2015. In February 2018, their first child, a daughter, was born. In August 2018, Geary announced that the couple was expecting their second child, a daughter, born in February 2019. They became engaged on Christmas Eve 2018. In December 2020, the couple announced the birth of their third child, a son. On May 30, 2025, Thicke married Geary in Cabo San Lucas, Mexico. Prior to the wedding, he re-proposed during a trip to Cannes, France, with a new engagement ring designed by Geary’s friend.

Thicke is a close friend of fellow performer Usher. Thicke was present for Usher's engagement to Tameka Foster, serenading the couple with his song "The Stupid Things" as Usher proposed among family and friends.

On November 10, 2018, Geary revealed in an Instagram story she and Thicke had lost their Malibu, California home to the Woolsey wildfire that had been consuming the area. Two days later, Thicke returned to his property, describing the totality of the fire in a video for Entertainment Tonight: "It's funny, [from what] you see in movies, you'd think there would be one doll left over, or a book of course, something. [But] it's just rubble. There's nothing left."

== Discography ==
Studio albums

- A Beautiful World (2002)
- The Evolution of Robin Thicke (2006)
- Something Else (2008)
- Sex Therapy: The Session (2009)
- Love After War (2011)
- Blurred Lines (2013)
- Paula (2014)
- On Earth, and in Heaven (2021)

== Tours ==
=== Headlining ===
- Evolution Tour (2007)
- Something Else Tour (2008)
- Love After War Tour (2012)
- Blurred Lines Tour (2014)

=== Co-headlining ===
- Jennifer Hudson & Robin Thicke in Concert (with Jennifer Hudson) (2009)

=== Promotional ===
- Love & War Tour (2011)

=== Opening act ===
- 2006 Tour (for India Arie) (2006)
- Once Again Tour (for John Legend) (2006)
- The Beyoncé Experience (for Beyoncé) (2007)
- Love Soul Tour (for Mary J. Blige) (2008)
- BLACKsummers'night Tour (for Maxwell) (2009)
- Freedom Tour (for Alicia Keys) (2010)
- Overexposed Tour (for Maroon 5) (2014)
- Sketchbook Tour (for Fantasia) (2019)
- Chicago & Friends (for Chicago) (2023)
- 2024 Tour (for Boyz II Men) (2024)

=== Cancelled ===
- This Is It (for Michael Jackson) (2009–10) (cancelled)
- Champagne and Roses Tour (for Ne-Yo) (2023) (dropped out)

== See also ==
- List of awards and nominations received by Robin Thicke
- Pharrell Williams v. Bridgeport Music
