= When I Get You Alone =

2002 single by Thicke

Single by Thicke

from the album A Beautiful World
- Released: September 23, 2002
- Genre: Funk; R&B
- Length: 3:37
- Label: Nu America; Interscope
- Songwriters: Robin Thicke; Walter Murphy
- Producer: Robin Thicke

Thicke singles chronology
"When I Get You Alone" (2002)	"Brand New Jones" (2002)

"When I Get You Alone" is a song by American singer Robin Thicke—recorded under the name Thicke—released on September 23, 2002, as his debut single. It was originally to be featured on his debut studio album Cherry Blue Skies, before being placed on a revamped version of that album called A Beautiful World. The song became a top-20 hit in Australia, Flanders, Italy, the Netherlands, and New Zealand, entering the top 10 in the latter two regions.

== Writing and inspiration ==
The track samples Walter Murphy's "A Fifth of Beethoven", which is based on Beethoven's Fifth Symphony. Songwriting credits thus went to Thicke and Murphy.

== Chart performance ==
"When I Get You Alone" did not chart on any US Billboard charts, though it did reach number 49 on the Radio & Records Pop chart; however, the song charted well in other countries. It peaked at number 3 on the Belgium's Ultratip, number 5 on the Dutch Mega Single Top 100, number 8 on the New Zealand Top 40 Singles, number 15 on the Belgium Ultratop 50 and the Italy Top Digital Download, number 17 on the Australian ARIA Top 50 Singles (did not release until mid-2003), number 60 on the Austrian Ö3 Austria Top 40, and number 62 on the Switzerland Singles Chart.

== Music video ==
The music video for the song featured an unshaven Thicke, with long, grungy hair, as a courier racing through the streets of Manhattan on a bicycle. It received some rotation on MTV2 and BET's Cita's World and was played moderately on pop and urban radio.

== Charts ==
=== Weekly charts ===
Weekly chart performance for "When I Get You Alone"
Chart (2003)	Peak position
Australia (ARIA)	17
Austria (Ö3 Austria Top 40)	60
Belgium (Ultratop 50 Flanders)	15
Belgium (Ultratip Bubbling Under Wallonia)	3
Hungary (Editors' Choice Top 40)	13
Italy (FIMI)	15
Netherlands (Dutch Top 40)	3
Netherlands (Single Top 100)	5
New Zealand (Recorded Music NZ)	8
Switzerland (Schweizer Hitparade)	62

=== Year-end charts ===
Year-end chart performance for "When I Get You Alone"
Chart (2003)	Position
Australia (ARIA)	84
Netherlands (Dutch Top 40)	32
Netherlands (Single Top 100)	51
New Zealand (RIANZ)	28

== Certifications ==
Certifications for "When I Get You Alone"
Region	Certification	Certified units/sales
Australia (ARIA)	Gold	35,000^{^}
^{^} Shipments figures based on certification alone.

== In popular culture ==
The song, along with Robin himself, was featured in a 2002 commercial for Sprite with appearances by Paula Patton and Andre Harrell.

The song received its most attention in the US in 2007, when American Idol runner-up Blake Lewis performed it during the top three. It has been a staple of other Idol productions as well, notably appearing on New Zealand Idol and Australian Idol.

This song was featured in the films The Rules of Attraction and Agent Cody Banks, in the episode "The Indicator" of Alias and also on October 19, 2008, the song was featured in an episode of Entourage. An a cappella version of this song is performed by Darren Criss and the Beelzebubs (playing the Dalton Academy Warblers) in the Glee episode "Silly Love Songs".

It also was featured in the opening episode of 2020's Strictly Come Dancing, where the professionals danced to it in their routine.
