= A Beautiful World =

Studio album by Robin Thicke
- Released: October 15, 2002
- Studios: Blue Jay Studios; Westlake Audio; Record Plant Studios (Los Angeles, California)
- Genres: Soul; R&B
- Length: 55:06
- Labels: NuAmerica; Interscope
- Producers: Robin Thicke; Pro Jay

Robin Thicke chronology
A Beautiful World (2002)	The Evolution of Robin Thicke (2006)

Singles from A Beautiful World
- 1. "When I Get You Alone" Released: September 23, 2002; 2. "Brand New Jones" Released: 2003

A Beautiful World is the debut studio album by American singer-songwriter Robin Thicke, then known simply as Thicke. Originally released on October 15, 2002, the album went under the name Cherry Blue Skies but was later renamed and reissued in April 2003, featuring the two extra tracks.Thicke approached the album experimentally, incorporating diverse musical styles and later describing it as an expression of the "limitless possibilities of music." The woman featured on the cover of the album is Paula Patton, who was Thicke's then-girlfriend.

Critics praised A Beautiful World for its eclectic blend of rock, soul, jazz, hip-hop, and 1970s influences, as well as Thicke’s falsetto and songwriting, though some found the album uneven and overly polished. Commercially, it peaked at number 152 on the US Billboard 200 and number four on the Heatseekers Albums chart, selling approximately 119,000 copies in the United States by January 2012. Lead single "When I Get You Alone," released in September 2002, became a top-20 hit in Australia, Flanders, Italy, the Netherlands, and New Zealand, entering the top 10 in the latter two regions.

== Background ==
Before releasing his own music, Thicke established himself in the late 1990s as a songwriter and producer, contributing to albums by artists including Brandy, Mýa, Jordan Knight, Christina Aguilera, and others. Raised in Los Angeles by actress-singer Gloria Loring and actor Alan Thicke, he began pursuing music as a teenager and signed his first recording contract with Interscope Records at 16 after gaining the attention of R&B singer Brian McKnight. After leaving his initial deal anda subsequent association with Tommy Mottola and Epic Records, Thicke focused on developing material for his debut album, initially intending to finance the project himself.

While developing the album, Thicke began working with veteran producer and label executive Andre Harrell and, under his guidance, eventually re-signed with Interscope in 2001 through Harrell's and Kenneth "Babyface" Edmonds' Nu America imprint label in 2001. Describing his approach to the album's creation, Thicke told Billboard: "I had no idea what I was doing while I was doing it. I just made decisions based on what sounds good and feels good." He explained that he freely incorporated different styles, following ideas ranging from rock guitar riffs to hip-hop drum beats. Reflecting on the album in 2008, Thicke described it as an "expression and the limitless possibilities of music," adding that he had "tried to do anything and everything on it."

== Critical reception ==
Professional ratings
Review scores
Source	Rating
AllMusic	2.5/5 stars
Blender	3/5 stars
Robert Christgau	(3-star Honorable Mention)
Now	2/5 Ns
Rolling Stone	2/5 stars

Critics praised A Beautiful World for its eclectic rock, soul, and R&B influences and Thicke's falsetto, while others found the album uneven, overproduced, and vocally underdeveloped. Writing for Blender, James Hunter praised the album's fusion of rock and soul, highlighting Thicke's falsetto on "Oh Shooter" and "Flowers in Bloom" and the energetic "Alone." He also praised Thicke for moving beyond the radio-oriented material he had previously written and produced for other artists. Billboard critic Michael Paoletta praised A Beautiful World for its eclectic fusion of jazz, classical, gospel, pop, psychedelic rock, hip-hop, Latin music, and 1970s soul. Paoletta highlighted Thicke's blue-eyed-soul vocals, comparing them favorably to Stevie Wonder and Marvin Gaye, and singled out "Suga Mama," "I'm Be Alright," and "Brand New Jones" as examples of his vocal style, concluding that the album successfully avoided both musical and social boundaries.

Robert Christgau gave A Beautiful World a three-star rating, praising Thicke's songwriting and talent in comparison with contemporary pop and R&B performers. He characterized Thicke as having "more brains than Justin" and "more talent than JC," while highlighting tracks such as "She's Gangsta" and "Make a Baby." AllMusic critic MacKenzie Wilson gave A Beautiful World a mixed review, praising its Motown, funk, and neo-soul influences and Thicke's "angel-like falsetto." She highlighted "Brand New Jones," "Flowers in Bloom," and "When I Get You Alone," but felt the album was uneven and that Thicke's lyrics and vocals remained underdeveloped. Now critic Matt Galloway was less favorable, arguing that the heavily polished production overwhelmed the material and criticizing Thicke's falsetto and the album's excesses, particularly its use of Beethoven's Fifth Symphony in "When I Get You Alone." Rolling Stone critic Jon Caramanica similarly praised "When I Get You Alone" but criticized Thicke's inconsistent vocals and the breezy arrangements on "Lazy Bones" and "Brand New Jones," which he found reminiscent of television sitcom music.

== Commercial performance ==
A Beautiful World debuted and peaked number 152 on the US Billboard 200, where it spent one week. The album also reached number four on Billboard's Heatseekers Albums chart. By January 2012, it had sold approximately 119,000 copies in the United States, according to Nielsen Soundscan.

== Track listing ==
All tracks written by Robin Thicke, except where it's co-credited.

Cherry Blue Skies track listing
No.	Title	Length
1.	"Oh Shooter"	4:35
2.	"Brand New Jones"	4:30
3.	"Flowers in Bloom"	3:47
4.	"Alone"	3:35
5.	"The Stupid Things"	3:45
6.	"Alright"	3:16
7.	"Suga Mama"	4:02
8.	"Vengas Conmigo"	4:02
9.	"Lazy Bones"	3:45
10.	"Flex"	3:28
11.	"Make a Baby"	2:40
12.	"Cherry Blue Skies"	4:28

A Beautiful World track listing
No.	Title	Writer(s)	Length
1.	"Oh Shooter"	James Gass; Bobby B. Keyes; Robert Daniels	4:36
2.	"A Beautiful World"	Sean Hurley	4:43
3.	"Suga Mama"		4:33
4.	"Flowers in Bloom"	Gass; Hurley; Daniels	3:46
5.	"When I Get You Alone"	Walter Murphy	3:37
6.	"The Stupid Things"		3:46
7.	"I'm a Be Alright"	Keyes; Erica Dymakkus	3:15
8.	"Brand New Jones"	Keyes	4:31
9.	"Vengas Conmigo"	Hurley; Keyes	4:02
10.	"Make a Baby"	Hurley	2:37
11.	"Flex"	Gass; Keyes	3:30
12.	"She's Gangsta"	Gass; Keyes	3:51
13.	"Lazy Bones"		3:47
14.	"Cherry Blue Skies"	Gass; Keyes	4:22

20th Anniversary deluxe edition
No.	Title	Writer(s)	Length
15.	"High School Man"	Gass	3:12
16.	"When I Get You Alone" (remix featuring Jadakiss)	Murphy	5:10

== Personnel ==
Credits adapted from liner notes and Allmusic.

- Robin Thicke — producer, piano
- Pro J — producer, drums, piano, mixing (tracks 2, 12), additional engineering
- Sean Hurley — bass
- Bobby B. Keyes — guitar
- Harry King — piano
- Larry Cox — piano
- Jean-Marie Horvat — mixing (tracks 1, 3-5, 7-11, 13, 14)
- Bill Malina — engineer, editing, mixing (tracks 6, 12)
- Adam Holmstead – additional engineering
- Dino Meneghin — additional guitar (track 5)
- Herman Matthews — live drums (track 5)
- Bill Meyers — orchestral arrangements (tracks 1, 8, 11)
- Randy Waldman — horn arrangements (track 9)
- Raphael Padilla — percussion (track 9)
- Drew Fitzgerald — art direction
- Sante D'Orazio — art direction, photography
- Andre Harrell — executive producer

== Charts ==
Chart performance for A Beautiful World
Chart (2002–03)	Peak position
US Billboard 200	152
US Heatseekers Albums (Billboard)	4
