= Lost Without U =

2006 single by Robin Thicke

Single by Robin Thicke

from the album The Evolution of Robin Thicke
- Released: December 4, 2006
- Recorded: 2006
- Genre: Soul; R&B; Bossa nova
- Length: 4.14
- Label: Interscope; Star Trak
- Songwriters: Robin Thicke; Sean Hurley
- Producers: Robin Thicke; Pro J

Robin Thicke singles chronology
"Shooter" (2006)	"Lost Without U" (2006)	"Can U Believe" (2007)

"Lost Without U" is a song by American singer Robin Thicke. It was released in 2006 as the second single from his second album, The Evolution of Robin Thicke (2006). People magazine voted the ballad as 2007's Sexiest Song of the Year. It was also named the 10th best song of 2007 by Vibe magazine.

== Writing and inspiration ==
"Lost Without U" was written after the release of Robin Thicke's first album, while he was on tour and troubled by his lack of commercial success. Thicke said the following to MTV News about the inspiration for the song: "I was going through an insecure period and wanted my lady to tell me how fabulous and how sexy and how wonderful I am."

== Music video ==
Thicke appears in the song's music video alongside his then-wife, actress Paula Patton. As his previous releases had underperformed, Thicke was concerned about the song's success. Thinking that its music video could be his last if it failed to chart, he cast his wife as his love interest.

Throughout the video, scenes are intercut of Thicke sitting on a chair playing his acoustic guitar and on a wall with a light flashing on him. The video begins with Thicke entering his apartment; he seems to be angry as he throws his keys to the floor. He is then seen on a bed, caressing his wife and kissing her shoulder. After, he is in a bathroom, where he imagines his wife taking off his clothes, though he is taking them off himself. After, his wife is shown in the shower, and he is shown singing. He is then shown sitting on a couch, and his wife walks up to him and sits on the couch suggestively, but then gets up and leaves. They are then shown in a bedroom, with Thicke's wife dancing and Thicke watching while holding a pair of socks (presumably hers). They are then shown on top of a building, enjoying each other's presence. Thicke is shown back in his apartment angry, when all of a sudden his wife walks in, and she lets her jacket fall off her, exposing a revealing outfit. They begin kissing passionately, and Thicke lifts her up, but is then shown alone, confused (he had dreamed the kissing session).

== Chart performance ==
"Lost Without U" has been known as Thicke's breakthrough single on the Billboard Hot 100, peaking at number 14 on the chart and became his biggest hit until 2013's "Blurred Lines". The song is his first single to chart on the Hot 100 from the album The Evolution of Robin Thicke.

It also remains Thicke's most successful single on the Billboard Hot R&B/Hip-Hop Songs chart, peaking at number one the week of February 24, 2007, becoming his first R&B chart-topper. He also became the first white male artist to top the R&B table since George Michael and his song "One More Try" in 1988. A week later, on the March 3 issue of Billboard, the single also hit number one on two other charts; Hot R&B/Hip-Hop Airplay and Adult R&B Airplay, simultaneously topping all three charts that week. The single eventually spent 11 consecutive weeks atop the Hot R&B/Hip-Hop Songs (the biggest hit of the year in that chart) and Adult R&B Airplay charts, and ten consecutive weeks atop the Hot R&B/Hip-Hop Airplay chart. The single was also popular in the United Kingdom, where it peaked at number 11 on the UK Singles Chart in July 2007.

The single has been credited to have caused the significant spike in the sales of The Evolution of Robin Thicke, helping the album to be certified platinum by the RIAA. As of July 12, 2013, the song has sold 954,000 copies in the United States. The single was certified platinum in digital sales by the RIAA on May 9, 2013.

== Remix ==
The official remix of the song features rapper Busta Rhymes.

== Cover versions ==
In 2008, bassist Marcus Miller recorded a version entitled "Lost Without U (Spoken Words)" with vocals by actress Taraji P. Henson and recording artist Lalah Hathaway for his album Marcus.

Adam Levine and Chris Jamison performed the song together on the season finale of The Voice (Season 7). Their duet peaked at number 63 on the Billboard Hot 100 chart.

== Charts ==
=== Weekly charts ===
Weekly chart performance for "Love Without U"
Chart (2006–07)	Peak position
Canada CHR/Top 40 (Billboard)	46
France (SNEP)	54
New Zealand (Recorded Music NZ)	37
Scotland (Official Charts Company)	25
UK Singles (Official Charts Company)	11
UK R&B (Official Charts Company)	2
US Billboard Hot 100	14
US Adult R&B Songs (Billboard)	1
US Hot R&B/Hip-Hop Songs (Billboard)	1
US Pop Airplay (Billboard)	27
US Smooth Jazz Airplay (Billboard)	13
US Rhythmic Airplay (Billboard)	15

Weekly chart performance for Chris Jamison and Adam Levine version
Chart (2015)	Peak position
Canada Hot 100 (Billboard)	84
US Billboard Hot 100	63
US Digital Song Sales (Billboard)	18

=== Year-end charts ===
2007 year-end chart performance for "Love Without U"
Chart (2007)	Peak position
US Billboard Hot 100	48
US R&B/Hip-Hop Songs (Billboard)	1

== Certifications ==
Certifications and sales for "Lost Without U"
Region	Certification	Certified units/sales
New Zealand (RMNZ)	Platinum	30,000^{‡}
United Kingdom (BPI)	Silver	200,000^{‡}
United States (RIAA)	Platinum	954,000
United States (RIAA) Mastertone	Platinum	1,000,000^{*}
^{*} Sales figures based on certification alone.^{‡} Sales+streaming figures based on certification alone.

== See also ==
- List of number-one R&B singles of 2007 (U.S.)
