= Blurred Lines Tour =

2014 concert tour by Robin Thicke

- Tour by Robin Thicke
- Associated album: Blurred Lines; Paula
- Start date: February 21, 2014
- End date: August 17, 2014
- Legs: 4
- No. of shows: 27 in North America; 6 in Europe; 33 total

Robin Thicke concert chronology
- Jennifer Hudson & Robin Thicke in Concert (2009); Blurred Lines Tour (2014)

The Blurred Lines Tour was the debut headlining tour by American recording artist, Robin Thicke. The tour supported his sixth studio album, Blurred Lines (2013). And later his seventh studio album Paula (2014) The tour traveled to North America and Europe, playing over 30 concerts.

== Background ==
Thicke first mentioned a tour shortly following the release of the album. He stated he wanted to spend the rest of the year promoting the album internationally. The end of 2013 saw the singer performing at many radio festivals, followed by a guest spot on Maroon 5's 2014 UK tour.

The tour was announced in September 2013. Before the tour began, it was faced with many challenges. In January 2014, opening act Jessie J dropped out of the tour, stating she wanted to focus on making new music. The following month, the singer revealed his separation from this wife, Paula Patton. Shortly after, the first three shows of the tour was rescheduled, citing vocal stress as the reasoning. Thicke was photographed in Canada and Disneyland during the cancelled shows. The tour kicked off in Fairfax, Virginia. At each show, Thicke dedicated "Lost Without U" to his estranged wife.

The Humanists of Boston University petitioned to have Thicke's concert at the Agganis Arena cancelled. The group stated the album's lead single promoted misogyny and rape culture. The university responded the school is not in correlation with the concert, with the show being organized by Live Nation. The group created a petition on Change.org, getting over three-thousand signatures. The concert proceeded as scheduled, with the group starting a small protest outside the arena.

During a break in the tour, Thicke recorded his next studio album, Paula. This saw the singer adding songs from the new album to the tour's setlist. The album was released in July 2014 and performed poorly.

== Opening acts ==
- DJ Cassidy (North America—Leg 1)
- K. Michelle (North America—Leg 1)

== Set list ==
The following setlist was obtained from the concert held on July 26, 2014; at the Casino Rama Entertainment Centre in Rama, Canada. It does not represent all concerts for the duration of the tour.

1. "Give It 2 U"
2. "Magic"
3. "Take It Easy on Me"
4. "Oh Shooter"
5. "Dreamworld"
6. "Pretty Lil Heart"
7. "Lost Without U"
8. "Instrumental Interlude"
9. "Too Little Too Late"
10. "Love Can Grow Back"
11. "Wanna Love You Girl"
12. "Lock the Door"
13. "Get Her Back"
14. "Shakin' It 4 Daddy"
15. "Rock with You"
16. "Let's Stay Together"

Encore

17. "Blurred Lines"
18. "Forever Love"

== Tour dates ==
Date	City	Country	Venue
North America
February 27, 2014	Fairfax	United States	Patriot Center
March 1, 2014	Ledyard	United States	MGM Grand Theatre
March 2, 2014	Atlantic City	United States	Borgata Event Center
March 4, 2014	Boston	United States	Agganis Arena
March 6, 2014	Camden	United States	Susquehanna Bank Center
March 7, 2014	New York City	United States	The Theater at Madison Square Garden
March 12, 2014	Detroit	United States	Fox Theatre
March 14, 2014	Cherokee	United States	Harrah's Cherokee Event Center
March 15, 2014	St. Louis	United States	Fox Theatre
March 16, 2014^{[A]}	Miami Beach	United States	Carnival Conquest
March 17, 2014	Atlanta	United States	Fox Theatre
March 18, 2014^{[B]}	Houston	United States	Reliant Stadium
March 20, 2014	Austin	United States	Moody Theater
March 21, 2014	Thackerville	United States	Global Event Center
March 23, 2014	Denver	United States	Fillmore Auditorium
March 26, 2014	Seattle	United States	WaMu Theater
March 29, 2014	San Francisco	United States	Bill Graham Civic Auditorium
April 27, 2014^{[C]}	New Orleans	United States	Fair Grounds Race Course
May 2, 2014^{[D]}	West Palm Beach	United States	West Palm Beach Waterfront
May 3, 2014	Indio	United States	Fantasy Springs Special Events Center
May 25, 2014^{[E]}	Oranjestad	Aruba	Nikki Beach Amphitheatre
June 7, 2014^{[F]}	Orlando	United States	Universal Music Plaza Stage
Europe
July 4, 2014	Sant Jordi	Spain	Seafront Stage
July 5, 2014^{[G]}	Birmingham	England	Perry Park
July 6, 2014^{[G]}	London	England	Finsbury Park
July 7, 2014^{[H]}	Monte Carlo	Monaco	Salle des Étoiles
July 11, 2014^{[I]}	Rotterdam	Netherlands	Theater Hal 1
July 13, 2014^{[J]}	Montreux	Switzerland	Auditorium Stravinski
North America
July 25, 2014^{[K]}	Cincinnati	United States	Paul Brown Stadium
July 26, 2014	Rama	Canada	Casino Rama Entertainment Centre
August 1, 2014^{[L]}	Indianapolis	United States	Fairgrounds Coliseum
August 15, 2014	Hammond	United States	The Venue at Horseshoe Hammond
August 17, 2014^{[M]}	Springfield	United States	Illinois State Grandstand

Festivals and other miscellaneous performances
^{A} This concert was a part of the "Ultimate Party with a Purpose"
^{B} This concert was a part of the "Houston Livestock Show and Rodeo"
^{C} This concert was a part of the "New Orleans Jazz & Heritage Festival"
^{D} This concert was a part of "SunFest"
^{E} This concert was a part of the "Soul Beach Music Festival"
^{F} This concert was a part of "Mardi Gras"
^{G} This concert was a part of the "Wireless Festival"
^{H} This concert was a part of the "Monte-Carlo Sporting Summer Festival"
^{I} This concert was a part of the "North Sea Jazz Festival"
^{J} This concert was a part of the "Montreux Jazz Festival"
^{K} This concert was a part of the "Macy's Music Festival"
^{L} This concert was a part of the "Indiana State Fair"
^{M} This concert was a part of the "Illinois State Fair"

Cancellations and rescheduled shows

February 21, 2014	Atlanta, Georgia	Fox Theatre	Rescheduled to March 17, 2014
February 22, 2014	Orlando, Florida	Universal Music Plaza Stage	Rescheduled to June 7, 2014
February 25, 2014	Cherokee, North Carolina	Harrah's Cherokee Event Center	Rescheduled to March 14, 2014
March 11, 2014	Rama, Canada	Casino Rama Entertainment Centre	Rescheduled to July 26, 2014
March 26, 2014	Phoenix, Arizona	PCC West Ballroom	Cancelled
March 27, 2014	Vancouver, Canada	Rogers Arena	Cancelled
March 28, 2014	Indio, California	Fantasy Springs Special Events Center	Rescheduled to May 3, 2014
July 19, 2014	San Dimas, California	Frank G. Bonelli Regional Park	Cancelled

=== Box office score data ===
Venue	City	Tickets sold / Available	Gross revenue
Patriot Center	Fairfax	2,819 / 7,551 (37%)	$153,133
The Theater at Madison Square Garden	New York City	5,018 / 5,409 (93%)	$345,108
Fox Theatre	Atlanta	2,219 / 3,904 (57%)	$151,642
TOTAL		10,056 / 16,864 (60%)	$649,883
