= Blurred Lines (disambiguation) =

"Blurred Lines" is a song by Robin Thicke.

Blurred Lines may also refer to:

- Blurred Lines (album), an album by Robin Thicke
- Blurred Lines Tour, the debut headlining tour by Robin Thicke
- "Blurred Lines" (Supergirl), an episode of Supergirl
