= List of awards and nominations received by Robin Thicke =

List of Robin Thicke's awards
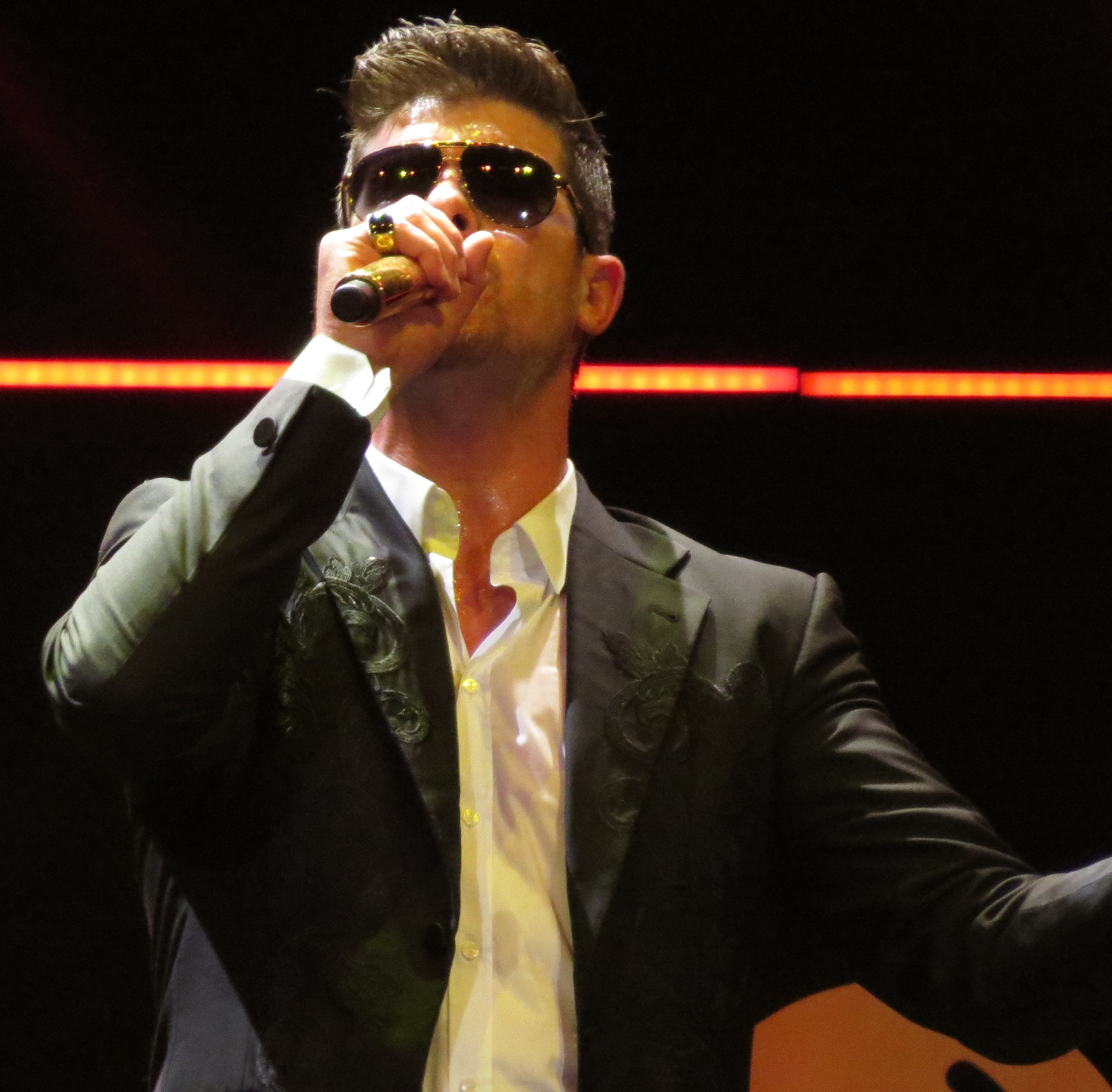
- Thicke in 2013
Award	Wins	Nominations
American Music Awards	0	4
ASCAP Awards	1	1
BET Awards	0	4
Billboard Awards	4	7
Grammy Awards	0	5
iHeartRadio Music Awards	0	4	
Juno Awards	0	4	
MOBO Awards	0	1	
MTV Europe Music Awards	0	4
MTV Video Music Awards	0	4	
NAACP Image Awards	1	4	
NME Awards	0	1	
NRJ Music Awards	0	2	
O Music Awards	0	1	
People's Choice Awards	0	2	
Premios 40 Principales	0	1	
Soul Train Music Award	2	8	
Teen Choice Awards	0	5	
World Music Awards	0	1	
- Totals
Awards won	8
Nominations	62

The following is a list of awards and nominations for Robin Thicke, an American singer, songwriter and record producer.

== American Music Awards ==
The American Music Awards is an annual awards ceremony created by Dick Clark in 1973 and one of several annual major American music awards shows (among the others are the Grammy Awards, the MTV Video Music Awards etc.). Robin Thicke has been nominated four times.

Year	Nominee / work	Award	Result
2007	Robin Thicke	New Artist of the Year	Nominated
2013	Robin Thicke	Favorite Pop/Rock Male Artist	Nominated
2013	Robin Thicke	Favorite Soul/R&B Male Artist	Nominated
2013	Blurred Lines	Favorite Soul/R&B Album	Nominated
2013	"Blurred Lines" (feat. T.I. & Pharrell)	Single of the Year	Nominated

== ASCAP Rhythm & Soul Music Awards ==
ASCAP honors its top members in a series of annual awards shows in seven different music categories: pop, rhythm and soul, film and television, Latin, country, Christian, and concert music. In addition, ASCAP inducts jazz greats to its Jazz Wall of Fame in an annual ceremony held at ASCAP's New York City offices and honors PRS members that license their works through ASCAP at an annual awards gala in London, England. Robin Thicke has won the award once.

Year	Nominee / work	Award	Result
2008	"Lost Without U"	Top R&B/Hip-Hop Song	Won

== BET Awards ==
The BET Awards were established in 2001 by the Black Entertainment Television network to celebrate African Americans and other minorities in music, acting, sports, and other fields of entertainment over the past year. Robin Thicke has been nominated three times.

Year	Nominee / work	Award	Result
2007	Robin Thicke	Best R&B Artists	Nominated
2007	"Lost Without U"	Viewer's Choice	Nominated
2012	Robin Thicke	Centric Award	Nominated
2014	"Blurred Lines" (feat. T.I. & Pharrell)	Best Collaboration	Nominated

== Billboard Music Awards ==
Year	Nominee / work	Award	Result
2014	"Blurred Lines" (with T.I., Pharrell Williams)	Top Radio Song	Won
2014	"Blurred Lines" (with T.I., Pharrell Williams)	Top Digital Song	Won
2014	"Blurred Lines" (with T.I., Pharrell Williams)	Top Hot 100 Song	Won
2014	"Blurred Lines" (with T.I., Pharrell Williams)	Top Streaming Song (Audio)	Nominated
2014	"Blurred Lines" (with T.I., Pharrell Williams)	Top R&B Song	Won
2014	Blurred Lines	Top R&B Album	Nominated
2014	Robin Thicke	Top R&B Artist	Nominated

== Grammy Awards ==
The Grammy Awards are awarded annually by the National Academy of Recording Arts and Sciences of the United States for outstanding achievements in the music industry. Considered the highest music honor, the awards were established in 1958. Thicke has been nominated five times.

Year	Nominee / work	Award	Result
2005	Confessions (as producer)	Album of the Year	Nominated
2009	Tha Carter III (as producer and featured artist)	Album of the Year	Nominated
2014	"Blurred Lines" (featuring T.I. and Pharrell)	Record of the Year	Nominated
2014	"Blurred Lines" (featuring T.I. and Pharrell)	Best Pop Duo/Group Performance	Nominated
2014	Blurred Lines	Best Pop Vocal Album	Nominated

== iHeartRadio Music Awards ==
Year	Nominee / work	Award	Result
2014	"Blurred Lines" (with T.I., Pharrell Williams)	Song of the Year	Nominated
2014	"Blurred Lines" (with T.I., Pharrell Williams)	Best Hip Hop/R&B Song of the Year	Nominated
2014	"Blurred Lines" (with T.I., Pharrell Williams)	Best Collaboration	Nominated
2014	Robin Thicke	Artist of the Year	Nominated

== Juno Awards ==
The Juno Awards are presented annually to musicians to acknowledge artistic and technical achievements in all aspects of Canadian music. Robin Thicke has been nominated once.

Year	Nominee / work	Award	Result
2012	"Pretty Lil' Heart" (feat. Lil Wayne)	R&B/Soul Recording of the Year	Nominated
2014	Robin Thicke	Artist of the Year	Nominated
2014	Robin Thicke	Fan Choice Award	Nominated
2014	Blurred Lines	Pop Album of the Year	Nominated

== MOBO Awards ==
Year	Nominee / work	Award	Result
2007	"Lost Without U"	Best Song	Nominated

== MTV Awards ==
=== MTV Video Music Award ===
Year	Nominee / work	Award	Result
2007	Robin Thicke	Male Artist of the Year	Nominated
2013	"Blurred Lines" (featuring T.I. & Pharrell)	Video of the Year	Nominated
2013	"Blurred Lines" (featuring T.I. & Pharrell)	Best Male Video	Nominated
2013	"Blurred Lines" (featuring T.I. & Pharrell)	Best Collaboration	Nominated

=== MTV Europe Music Awards ===
Year	Nominee / work	Award	Result
2013	"Blurred Lines" (with T.I., Pharrell Williams)	Best Song	Nominated
2013	"Blurred Lines" (with T.I., Pharrell Williams)	Best Video	Nominated
2013	Robin Thicke	Best United States Act	Nominated
2013	Performance at World Stage Malaysia	Best World Stage Performance	Nominated

== NAACP Image Awards ==
Year	Nominee / work	Award	Result
2014	"Blurred Lines" (with T.I., Pharrell Williams)	Outstanding Duo, Group or Collaboration	Won
2014	"Blurred Lines" (with T.I., Pharrell Williams)	Outstanding Song	Nominated
2014	Blurred Lines	Outstanding Album	Nominated
2014	Robin Thicke	Outstanding Male Artist	Nominated

== NME Awards ==
Year	Nominee / work	Award	Result
2014	Robin Thicke	Villain of the Year	Nominated

== NRJ Music Awards ==
Year	Nominee / work	Award	Result
2014	Robin Thicke & Pharrell Williams	International Duo/Group of the Year	Nominated
2014	Robin Thicke	International Male Artist of the Year	Nominated

== O Music Awards ==
Year	Nominee / work	Award	Result
2013	"Blurred Lines" (with T.I., Pharrell Williams)	Too Much Ass for TV (NSFW Music Videos)	Nominated

== People's Choice Awards ==
Year	Nominee / work	Award	Result
2014	Robin Thicke	Favorite R&B Artist	Nominated
2014	Blurred Lines	Favorite Album	Nominated

== Premios 40 Principales ==
Los Premios 40 Principales were created in 2006 by Spanish radio station Los 40 Principales as part of the celebrations of the 40th anniversary of its foundation. Thicke has received one nomination.

Year	Nominee / work	Award	Result
2013	Blurred Lines	Best International Song	Nominated

== Soul Train Music Awards ==
The "Soul Train Music Awards" is an annual award show which previously aired in national television syndication, and honors the best in music and entertainment. Robin Thicke has won the award twice from eight nominations.

Year	Nominee / work	Award	Result
2007	The Evolution of Robin Thicke	Best R&B/Soul Album, Male	Nominated
2009	Robin Thicke	Best Male R&B/Soul Artist	Nominated
2012	Robin Thicke	Best Male R&B/Soul Artist	Nominated
2013	Robin Thicke	Best Male R&B/Soul Artist	Nominated
2013	"Blurred Lines" (feat. T.I. & Pharrell)	Best Collaboration	Won
2013	"Blurred Lines" (feat. T.I. & Pharrell)	Best Dance Performance	Nominated
2013	"Blurred Lines" (feat. T.I. & Pharrell)	Song of the Year	Won
2013	"Blurred Lines" (feat. T.I. & Pharrell)	Video of the Year	Nominated

== Teen Choice Awards ==
Year	Nominee / work	Award	Result
2007	Robin Thicke	Choice Music: Breakout Artist – Male	Nominated
2007	"Lost Without U"	Choice Music: Love Song	Nominated
2013	Robin Thicke	Choice Music: Male Artist	Nominated
2013	"Blurred Lines" (feat. T.I. & Pharrell)	Choice Music: Single – Male Artist	Nominated
2013	"Blurred Lines" (feat. T.I. & Pharrell)	Choice Summer: Song	Nominated

== World Music Awards ==
Year	Nominee / work	Award	Result
2008	Robin Thicke	World's Best Selling R&B Male	Nominated
