= For the Rest of My Life (disambiguation) =

For the Rest of My Life is a song by Robin Thicke

For the Rest of My Life may also refer to:

- "For The Rest of My Life", song by Gary Numan from Dead Moon Falling
- "For The Rest of My Life", song by Steve Augeri 2013
- "For The Rest of My Life", song by Dakota Staton Rose Marie McCoy, Charles Singleton 1955
- "For The Rest of My Life", song by Donna Fargo Fargo 1979
- "For The Rest of My Life", song by Eugene Church and The Fellows, Church, Williams 1959
- "For The Rest of My Life", song by Richard Kerr Kerr, Peel 1969
- "For The Rest of My Life (Dedicate All' Amore)", by Dionne Warwick Curtis, Carraresi, Pace 1968
