= Sex Therapy: The Session =

Studio album by Robin Thicke
- Released: December 15, 2009
- Genres: R&B; soul; hip-hop
- Length: 45:33
- Labels: Star Trak; Interscope
- Producers: Jeff Bhasker; Toby Gad; Hot Sauce; Polow da Don; Pro Jay; Rich Skillz; Teddy Riley; Robin Thicke; Vidal Dre Productions

Robin Thicke chronology
Something Else (2008)	Sex Therapy: The Session (2009)	Love After War (2011)

Singles from Sex Therapy: The Session
- 1. "Sex Therapy" Released: October 20, 2009; 2. "Rollacoasta" Released: March 8, 2010; 3. "It's in the Mornin'" Released: March 2010; 4. "Shakin' It 4 Daddy" Released: February 8, 2011

Sex Therapy: The Session is the fourth studio album by American R&B singer Robin Thicke, released December 15, 2009 on Star Trak Entertainment in the United States. The album marked a broader musical approach for Thicke, incorporating stronger hip-hop influences and a more collaborative production process while embracing the sensual themes associated with his music and pursuing a lighter, more accessible sound. Thus, Sex Therapy: The Session features an expanded roster of guest artists, including Jay-Z, Game, Kid Cudi, Snoop Dogg, Nicki Minaj and Estelle.

The album received generally favorable reviews, with critics praising Thicke's songwriting, sensual themes, and blend of R&B, soul, hip-hop, and contemporary production, though some criticized its reliance on guest artists, awkward lyrics, and occasionally cartoonish approach to sexuality. Commercially, Sex Therapy: The Session debuted at number nine on the US Billboard 200 and number two on the Top R&B/Hip-Hop Albums chart, selling 123,000 copies in its first week and becoming Thicke's third consecutive top-10 album. The album lead single, "Sex Therapy," became a top ten hit on the US Adult R&B Songs chart.

== Background ==
In September 2008, Thicke released Something Else, his third studio album, on Star Trak Entertainment and Interscope Records. A follow-up to his breakthrough, multi-platinum-selling album The Evolution of Robin Thicke (2006), it combined live instrumentation with influences from classic Philadelphia soul, Motown, and 1970s disco. The album received generally favorable reviews, debuted at number three on the US Billboard 200, and was certified gold by the RIAA in 2024. Although it produced two number-two hits on the US Adult R&B Songs chart, ""Magic" and "The Sweetest Love", it was ultimately less commercially successful than its predecessor.

For his next project, Sex Therapy: The Session, Thicke sought to broaden his musical approach while making the album more audience-oriented than his previous work. In an interview with Essence, he explained that, whereas he had previously approached albums primarily according to his own artistic preferences, he wanted the new record to offer something for different audiences and experimented with a more collaborative production process. Unlike his first three albums, which he had largely written and produced with longtime collaborator Pro-Jay, Sex Therapy drew production from several contributors, allowing Thicke to focus less on controlling every musical element and more on creating songs suited to the album's overall concept

Thicke also described Sex Therapy as a more direct exploration of the sensual themes that had characterized his music throughout his career. He noted that listeners had frequently characterized his music as suitable for romance and intimacy, and said the album's title deliberately embraced that reputation. The project combined this sensual focus with Thicke's longstanding influences from soul and R&B and his desire to incorporate more of his hip-hop background, citing artists including Run-DMC, N.W.A., the Notorious B.I.G., Tupac Shakur, and Jay-Z. He further characterized the album as a departure from the introspective and melancholic material of his earlier releases, seeking a lighter and more accessible sound.

== Release and promotion ==
There are two different versions of the album. The regular version is called Sex Therapy: The Session. The deluxe version, released on the same day, is called Sex Therapy: The Experience and has five additional tracks. Unlike most other special editions, where the bonus tracks are all at the end, the extra tracks on The Experience are mixed in with the regular Session track listing.

=== Singles ===
The album's first single, "Sex Therapy", was released on October 20, 2009. It reached number 54 on the US Billboard Hot 100 and number 1 on the Hot R&B/Hip-Hop Songs chart. The official second single outside of the US is "Rollercoasta" featuring Estelle. The music video was filmed in February 2010. The video premiered on March 19, 2010. The single was released on March 8, 2010.

=== Other songs ===
"Meiplé", a collaboration with rapper Jay-Z, was released to iTunes on December 1, 2009, as a promo single prior to the release of the album. It impacted Italian radio in January 2010 and peaked at number No. 63 on the airplay chart. "Shakin' It 4 Daddy" featuring Nicki Minaj was set to be the third US single released from the album but the release was later cancelled. He performed the song numerous times, including on BET's 106 & Park in December 2009 and on the Late Show with David Letterman in February 2010 which led to extreme popularity among both artists. A remix of the song, Shakin' It 4 Daddy" (Manon Dave Remix), was made available for purchase as a digital download on February 8, 2011. "It's in the Mornin'" featuring Snoop Dogg instead of "Rollercoasta". A music video for the single was shot in March 2010 with The Price Is Right's Manuela Arbeláez playing his love interest. The video premiered on May 9, 2010.

=== Tour ===
Thicke was added as a supporting act on Alicia Keys' Freedom Tour, which kicked off on February 28, 2010, in Montreal, Quebec, Canada, with stops at Madison Square Garden and Staples Center, performing material from Sex Therapy.

== Critical reception ==
Professional ratings
Aggregate scores
Source	Rating
Metacritic	70/100
Review scores
Source	Rating
AllMusic	3.5/5 stars
The A.V. Club	B−
Entertainment Weekly	B+
Los Angeles Times	2.5/4 stars
Newsday	A−
PopMatters	6/10
Q	3/5 stars
USA Today	3/4 stars

Upon its release, Sex Therapy received generally positive reviews from most music critics, based on an aggregate score of 70/100 from Metacritic. AllMusic writer Andy Kellman gave it 3½ out of 5 stars and praised Thicke's singing, calling his falsetto "one of the best voices in R&B". Entertainment Weekly's Simon Vozick-Levinson gave Sex Therapy a B+ rating and wrote "Thicke takes a few more risks on his fourth album... slinging falsetto boasts and come-ons over futuristic electro-funk backdrops". Associated Content writer Chris A. Sosa gave it an A rating and wrote that it "serves as Thicke's stepping out, finally embracing the simmering sexuality that's always lurked just barely below the surface of his soaring falsetto". Alex Thornton of HipHopDX gave the album 4 out of 5 stars and commended Thicke for his songwriting ability. Elysa Gardner of USA Today gave the album 3 out of 4 stars and wrote that its songs are "better vehicles for Thicke and his collaborators' naughty wit and seductive grooves than they are for his silky croon". Newsday's Glenn Gamboa gave Sex Therapy an A− rating and viewed that Thicke's attempt to incorporate other musical styles "sound as effortless as his Princely falsetto". The Huffington Post's Mike Ragogna wrote favorably of its sexual themes and called the album "a potent mix of r&b and rap with the soulful singer-songwriter channeling Marvin and Smokey on some of the more seductive songs". Jon Caramanica of The New York Times lauded Thicke for dispensing with the "characteristic politesse" of his previous work, while calling it "the best album of his career, and also the most ridiculous".

The Washington Post's Allison Stewart described it as "a gooey, goofy, occasionally great, obsessively carnal mix of '70s soul and mid-'00s computerized retro/futurist hip-pop", but perceived an "overemphasis on guest stars and superstar production" and found Thicke's songwriting "awkward". PopMatters writer Tyler Lewis gave Sex Therapy a 6/10 rating and called it "a well-made album", but found its sexually themed songs "cheeky, not sensual", writing "It is definitely more cartoonish than anything 70s soul men would have released, no matter how great some of the melodies are". Okayplayer writer Kendred Spirit perceived Thicke's departure from his previous work's aesthetic as breaking his "artistic morality", stating "he simply does not sound right over the intrusive synths and fuzzy drum beats of today's pop". Q gave the album 3 out of 5 stars and noted its "Prince-ly fixation with carnal knowledge" as "a touch of the absurd", but stated "Still, it's delivered with panache, thanks to Thicke's versatile pop-soul vocals and some slick production work". Los Angeles Times writer August Brown gave the album 2½ out of 4 stars and wrote "his new randiness adds zip to an always-perfect falsetto". Despite having a mixed response towards its collaborational tracks, Mark Edward Nero of About.com gave it 3½ out of 5 stars and commended Thicke for "expanding his horizons." The A.V. Club's Joshua Alston gave it a B− rating and called it "admirable", stating "Sex Therapy is certainly not grown, nor particularly sexy, but it's often great, sometimes because of its lover-boy goofiness, other times in spite of it".

== Commercial performance ==
Sex Therapy: The Session debuted at number 9 on the US Billboard 200 and at number 2 on the Top R&B/Hip-Hop Albums, selling 123,000 copies in its first week. It marked Thicke's third consecutive top-10 album, following The Evolution of Robin Thicke, which peaked at number five in 2007, and Something Else, which peaked at number three in 2008; the latter opened with 137,000 copies. Sex Therapy: The Session fell to number 31 in its second week, before rising to number 21 in its third week and subsequently declining to numbers 24 and 28. It later re-entered the chart at number 35, supported by renewed sales and airplay. By February 2010, the album had sold approximately 269,000 copies in the United States.

== Track listing ==
Sex Therapy: The Session – Standard edition
No.	Title	Writer(s)	Producer(s)	Length
1.	"Mrs. Sexy"	Robin Thicke; Al Green	Thicke; Pro Jay	4:23
2.	"Sex Therapy"	Thicke; Ester Dean; Jamal Jones; Paul Dawson; Herb Wiener; Seymour Gottlieb; John Gluck; Walter Gold	Polow da Don; Thicke; Hot Sauce^{[a]}	4:35
3.	"Meiplé" (with Jay-Z)	Thicke; Shawn Carter; Max; Jean-Max Riviere; Gerard Bourgeois	Thicke; Pro Jay; Jeff Bhasker^{[a]}	4:02
4.	"Make U Love Me"	Thicke; Richard Velonskis; Max; Nikki Leonti	Thicke; Rich Skillz	3:02
5.	"It's in the Mornin'" (with Snoop Dogg)	Thicke; Teddy Riley; Calvin Broadus; Jay Mathis	Riley; Thicke^{[a]}	3:01
6.	"Shakin' It 4 Daddy" (with Nicki Minaj)	Thicke; Jamal Jones; Dean; Onika Maraj	Polow da Don	3:52
7.	"Elevatas" (with Kid Cudi)	Thicke; Bhasker; Scott Mescudi	Bhasker; Thicke	4:39
8.	"Rollacoasta" (with Estelle)	Thicke; Bhasker; Estelle Swaray	Bhasker; Thicke	4:14
9.	"Million Dolla Baby"	Thicke; Marvin Gaye; Andre Harrell	Thicke; Pro Jay	3:11
10.	"2 Luv Birds"	Thicke; Andre Harris; Vidal Davis; Jamar Jones	Dre & Vidal; Thicke	3:36
11.	"Jus Right"	Thicke; James Gass	Thicke; Pro Jay	2:50
12.	"Diamonds" (with Game)	Thicke; Jamal Jones; Dawson; Max; Jayceon Taylor	Thicke; Polow da Don	4:07

Sex Therapy: The Experience – Deluxe edition
No.	Title	Writer(s)	Producer(s)	Length
1.	"911"	Thicke; Gass	Thicke; Pro Jay	0:22
2.	"Mrs. Sexy"	Thicke; Green; McDonalds	Thicke; Pro Jay	4:23
3.	"Sex Therapy"	Thicke; Dean; Jamal Jones; Dawson; Wiener; Gottlieb; Gluck; Gold	Polow da Don; Thicke; Hot Sauce^{[a]}	4:35
4.	"Meiplé" (with Jay-Z)	Thicke; Carter; Max; Riviere; Bourgeois	Thicke; Pro Jay; Bhasker^{[a]}	4:02
5.	"Make U Love Me"	Thicke; Velonskis; Max; Leonti	Thicke; Rich Skillz	3:02
6.	"It's in the Mornin'" (with Snoop Dogg)	Thicke; Riley; Broadus; Jay Mathis	Riley; Thicke^{[a]}	3:01
7.	"Shakin' It 4 Daddy" (with Nicki Minaj)	Thicke; Jamal Jones; Dean; Minaj	Polow da Don	3:52
8.	"Elevatas" (with Kid Cudi)	Thicke; Bhasker; Mescudi	Bhasker; Thicke	4:39
9.	"Start with a Kiss"	Thicke; Gass; Max	Thicke; Pro Jay	1:18
10.	"Rollacoasta" (with Estelle)	Thicke; Bhasker; Swaray	Bhasker; Thicke	4:14
11.	"Million Dolla Baby"	Thicke; Gaye; Harrell	Thicke; Pro Jay	3:11
12.	"2 Luv Birds"	Thicke; Harris; Davis; Jamar Jones	Dre & Vidal; Thicke	3:36
13.	"I Got U"	Thicke; Gass	Thicke; Pro Jay	3:02
14.	"Jus Right"	Thicke; Gass	Thicke; Pro Jay	2:50
15.	"Mona Lisa"	Thicke; Toby Gad	Gad	3:34
16.	"Brand New Luv"	Thicke; Gass; Max	Thicke; Pro Jay	3:01
17.	"Diamonds" (with Game)	Thicke; Jamal Jones; Dawson; Max; Taylor	Thicke; Polow da Don	4:07

Sex Therapy: The Experience – Deluxe edition (iTunes Store bonus track)
No.	Title	Writer(s)	Producer(s)	Length
18.	"Sex Therapy" (Luda Remix) (featuring Ludacris)	Thicke; Dean; Jamal Jones; Dawson; Wiener; Gottlieb; Gluck; Gold; Christopher Bridges	Polow da Don; Thicke; Hot Sauce^{[a]}	4:01

Notes

- ^{^[a]} signifies co-producer(s)

Sample credits

- "Mrs. Sexy" contains interpolations from the composition "I'm Glad You're Mine", written by Al Green.
- "Sex Therapy" contains elements of "It's My Party", written by Herb Wiener, Seymour Gottlieb, John Gluck, and Walter Gold.
- "Meiplé" contains a sample from "Moi Je Joue", written by Jean-Max Riviere and Gerard Bourgeois, and performed by Brigitte Bardot.
- "Million Dolla Baby" contains interpolations from the composition "Trouble Man", written by Marvin Gaye.

== Personnel ==
The track numbers correspond to the deluxe edition.

- Robin Thicke – lead vocals, background vocals (tracks 2, 4, 9, 10, 13–15, 17), instruments (4), keyboards (5), piano (17), flute (1, 13), mixing (1, 4, 6, 8, 9, 11–16)
- Russell Ali – guitar (track 5)
- Brian "Fluff" Allison – assistant engineer (track 3)
- Angel Aponte – Estelle vocal engineer (track 10)
- Joe Augello – guitar (tracks 2, 8, 11)
- Jeff Bhasker – instruments (track 10), mixing (4)
- Larry Cox – organ (track 2), keyboards (11), instruments (4)
- Idris Davis – bass guitar (track 12)
- Vidal Davis – additional instruments (track 12)
- Estelle – background vocals (track 10)
- Toby Gad – instruments (track 15)
- Lemar Guillary – trombone (track 2)
- Andre Harrell – executive producer
- Andre Harris – additional instruments (track 12)
- Jimmy Hawes – acoustic bass (track 9)
- Hot Sauce – guitar and strings (track 17)
- Jimmy Iovine – executive producer}
- Jamar Jones – keyboards (track 12)
- Brandon Kilgour – engineer (track 12)
- Josef Leimberg – trumpet (track 2)
- Bill Malina – engineer (tracks 1, 2, 4–6, 8–11, 13–15), mixing (5, 6, 11), vocal engineer (12)
- Greg Malone – bass guitar (track 2)
- Dwight Mikkelson – string programming (track 2), horns and strings (11)
- Ann Mincieli – engineer (track 11)
- Polow da Don – drums (track 17)
- Keschia Potter – saxophone (track 2)
- Pro Jay – drums (tracks 1, 2, 4, 9, 11, 13, 14, 16) percussion (1, 2, 9, 13, 14, 16), bass guitar (1, 11, 13, 14, 16), guitar (1, 9, 13, 14, 16), piano (1, 9, 13), organ (1, 13, 16), keyboards (14), accordion (1, 13), flute (9), keyboard bass (9), engineer (15, 16)
- Ari Raskin – Kid Cudi vocal engineer (track 8), additional engineering (10), engineer (11)
- Rich Skillz – drums (track 5)
- Teddy Riley – instruments, engineer, and mixing (track 6)
- Wendell Sewell – guitar (track 12)
- Adam Smirnoff – guitar (tracks 8, 10)
- Jeremy Stevenson – engineer (tracks 3, 7, 17)
- Jazmine Sullivan – background vocals (track 11)
- Rich Travali – mixing (tracks 1–4, 8, 9, 11–16)
- Rob Walker – executive producer
- Pharrell Williams – executive producer

== Charts ==
=== Weekly charts ===
Weekly performance for Sex Therapy: The Session
Chart (2009)	Peak position
US Billboard 200	9
US Top R&B/Hip-Hop Albums (Billboard)	2

=== Year-end charts ===
Year-end performance for Sex Therapy: The Session
Chart (2010)	Position
US Billboard 200	68
US Top R&B/Hip-Hop Albums (Billboard)	22

== Release history ==
Sex Therapy: The Session release history
Region	Date	Format	Label(s)	Ref.
United States	December 15, 2009	Digital download; CD	Interscope	
United Kingdom	April 26, 2010	Digital download; CD	Interscope	
