= Give It 2 U =

Single by Robin Thicke featuring Kendrick Lamar

from the album Blurred Lines
- Released: August 27, 2013
- Recorded: 2013
- Studio: Luke's in the Boo (Malibu); Record Plant Studios (Los Angeles); TDE Red Room Studios (Carson)
- Genre: Hip hop; electropop; dubstep; R&B
- Length: 3:49 (album version); 4:20 (remix with 2 Chainz)
- Label: Star Trak; Interscope
- Songwriters: Robin Thicke; Kendrick Duckworth; William Adams; Lukasz Gottwald; Henry Walter
- Producers: Dr. Luke; Cirkut

Robin Thicke singles chronology
"For the Rest of My Life" (2013)	"Give It 2 U" (2013)	"Feel Good" (2013)

Kendrick Lamar singles chronology
"Fragile" (2013)	"Give It 2 U" (2013)	"Forbidden Fruit" (2013)

Music video
- "Give It 2 U" on YouTube

"Give It 2 U" is a song by American singer-songwriter Robin Thicke from his sixth studio album, Blurred Lines (2013). It was written and produced by Dr. Luke and Cirkut, with additional writing by Thicke, the featured artist Kendrick Lamar, and will.i.am. Originally titled "Give It to Me", a demo version of the song premiered on the radio show Sway in the Morning on May 2, 2013. Featuring guest vocals from Lamar, it was released as the third single from the album on August 27, 2013. "Give It 2 U" is an uptempo hip hop and electropop song with elements of dubstep. Lyrically, Thicke sings about sexually pleasing a partner.

The song received mixed reviews, with some music critics praising it as one of the best tracks from Blurred Lines, while others criticized it for its overt sexual lyrics. However, Lamar's verse in the song was lauded by many critics. "Give It 2 U" achieved moderate success on the charts internationally, receiving more success than the prior single "For the Rest of My Life". The song became a top 40 hit in Australia, Belgium, Canada, Germany, New Zealand, Scotland, the United Kingdom, and the United States. It peaked at number 45 on both of Billboard's Hot R&B/Hip-Hop Songs and Rhythmic year-end charts.

An accompanying music video for "Give It 2 U" premiered on August 23, 2013. Directed by Diane Martel, the video was commissioned for a remix of the song, featuring Lamar and an additional verse by 2 Chainz. The video portrays Thicke as a referee, as several dance teams and floats surround him on a football field. The video was met with mixed reception. The song was promoted at the 2013 MTV Video Music Awards alongside Lamar, 2 Chainz, and Miley Cyrus, following a highly controversial performance of "Blurred Lines". It was also regularly performed during Thicke's debut headlining tour, the Blurred Lines Tour (2014).

== Background and recording ==
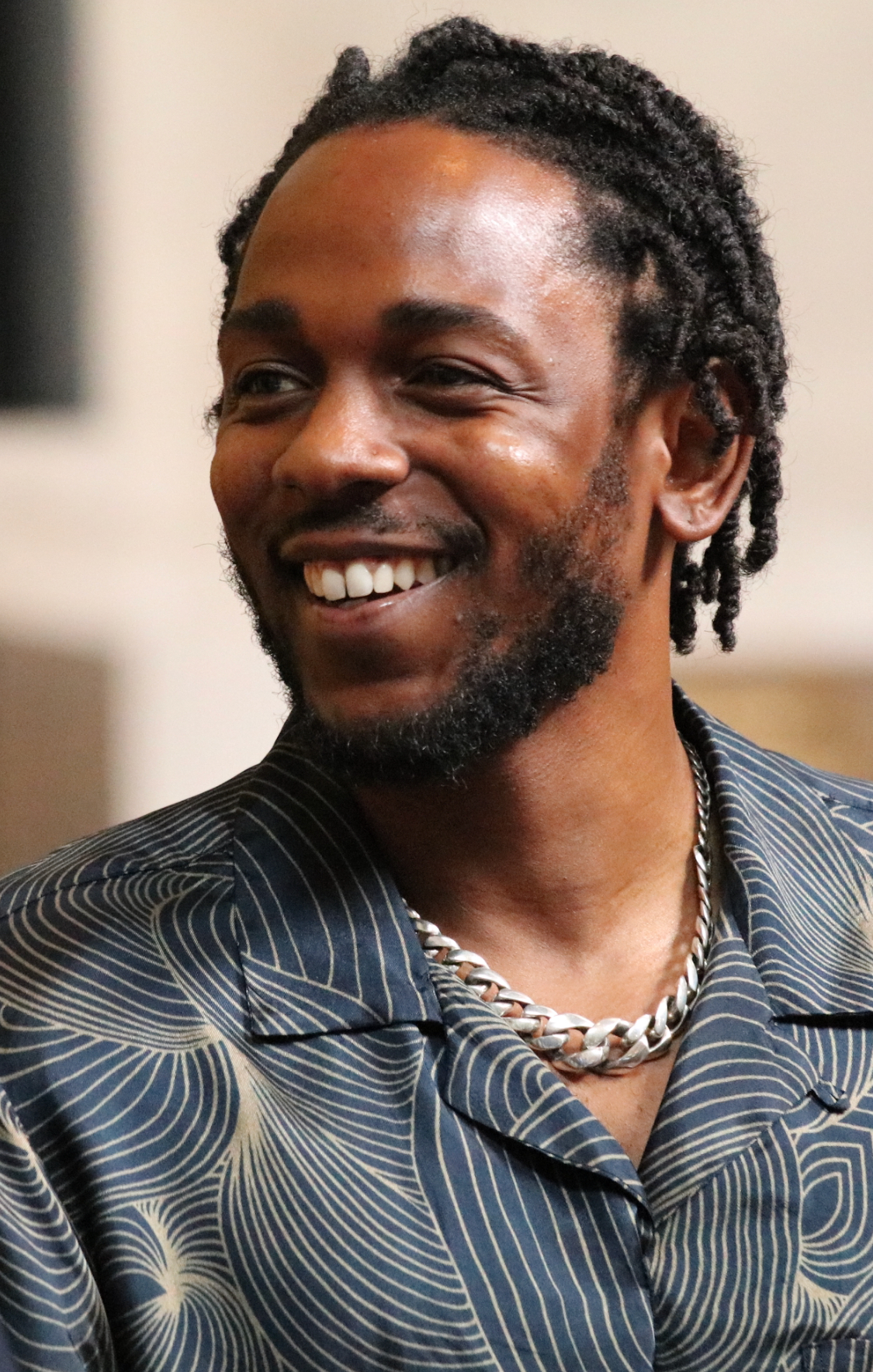
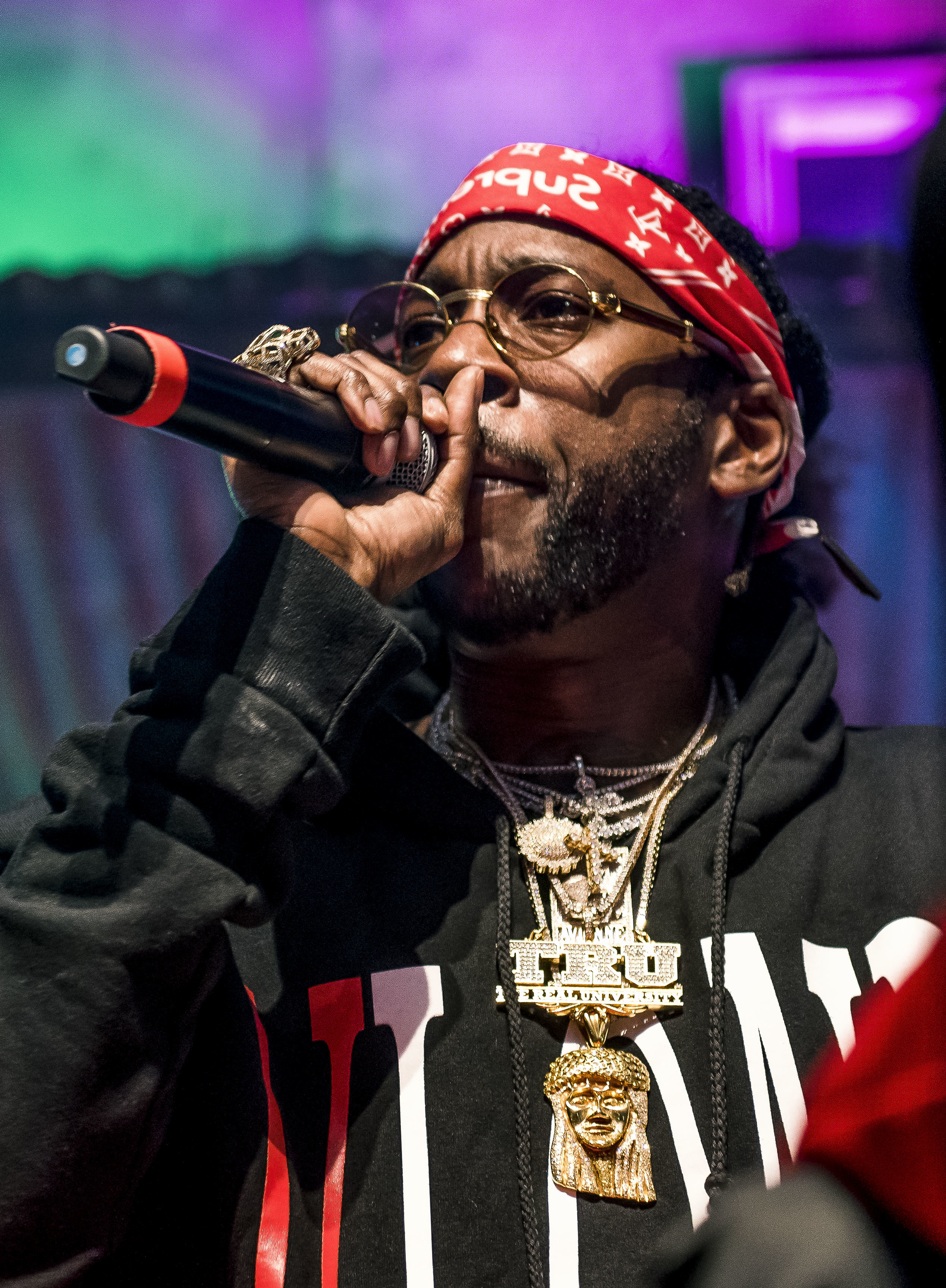
In "Give It 2 U", Thicke collaborated with rappers Kendrick Lamar (left) and 2 Chainz (right).

The song was written and produced by Dr. Luke, and Cirkut, with additional writing by Thicke, Kendrick Lamar and will.i.am. It was written in approximately an hour, with Thicke striving to write a carefree song that is "straight to the dancefloor, straight to the sexy". When discussing the song, Thicke described it as "very Michael Jackson, Prince but also pretty hip-hop. It’s a big, shiny pop record. It’s fun". Thicke originally reached out to 2 Chainz to record a verse for the song, although his management had also simultaneously sent the song out to Kendrick Lamar. Both rappers expressed interest in appearing on the song, resulting in a demo entitled "Give It to Me". On May 2, 2013, Thicke premiered this demo on the radio show Sway in the Morning. However, this version of the song was later relegated to a remix on the deluxe edition of Blurred Lines (2013), with the album version only featuring Lamar.

"Give It 2 U" was recorded at Luke's in the Boo, Record Plant Studios, and TDE Red Room Studios in Malibu, Los Angeles, and Carson, respectively.

== Composition and remixes ==
"Give It 2 U" is an electropop and hip hop song featuring elements of dubstep.

Lyrically, the song discusses Thicke's desire to sexually please a partner. Speaking on the lyric "Big dick for ya, let me give it to ya", Thicke explained that it was "more a comment of swagger. Like, I'm big-dick swingin'".

A remix version for the song, featuring an additional verse from 2 Chainz, was made available as one of the bonus tracks on the deluxe edition of Blurred Lines (2013). Another version, the "Norman Doray & Rob Adans Remix", was released in 2013.

== Critical reception ==
Rob Tannenbaum of Rolling Stone praised the song, citing it as one of the parent album's "cheeky impersonations of dubstep". Andrew Chan of Slant Magazine criticized the sexual lyrics of the song, citing it as a low point on the album. Sophie Schillaci of The Hollywood Reporter criticized the song's sexual lyrical content, claiming that "In the wake of Robin Thicke’s “Blurred Lines” controversy (and wild success), the singer is giving his critics some fresh ammo".

== Chart performance ==
In the United States, "Give It 2 U" debuted at number 83 on the Billboard Hot 100 chart for the issue dated September 7, 2013. The song spent a total of 12 weeks on the chart, peaking at number 25 for the issue dated September 14, 2013. On the Dance Club Songs and Mainstream Top 40 charts, the song peaked at number 21 and 13, respectively. The song reached the top ten on both the Hot R&B/Hip-Hop Songs and Rhythmic charts, peaking at number 7 and 6, respectively. It also reached the number 45 position on the year-end versions of both charts.

== Music video ==
=== Background ===
The music video was directed by Diane Martel in Los Angeles, California and premiered on August 23, 2013, on MTV. Rather than the album version, the video was produced for the remix of "Give It 2 U" featuring both Kendrick Lamar and 2 Chainz. It features appearances by three models including Alana Greszatai, Jessica Strother, and Mallory Llewellyn, all of whom are termed the "Luxury Girls" in the video. Three American dance teams, including The Passionettes, The Stingettes, and The Baker Girls, also made an appearance in the video. Before its release, MTV News reported that it was set on a football field, noting that "Thicke and Lamar [are] riding around on mini trucks with women on their laps". In the video, Thicke wore gold-rimmed sunglasses and a golden whistle, while alternating between a black suit jacket and a black-and-white striped suit, with the latter in reference to the referee outfit he wore during his performance at the 2013 MTV Video Music Awards. When speaking on working with Martel, Thicke said,

It's a Diane Martel dream, and I'm just happy to be here. The thing about Diane Martel that makes it so amazing — besides just being a crazy genius — is that she combines all different parts of the world into one soup. She takes the cotton candy, she takes the beautiful football-playing girls and she mixes it all up into one beautiful pot. So we're all very lucky to have her and excited to be working with her again

=== Synopsis and reception ===
The video is set on a football field and features a cameo by Thicke's son, Julian Fuego, as well as college dance teams from Albany State University and Alabama State University. Several dancers called "Luxury Girls" are shown dressed up like bottles of champagne, rolls of $100 bills and tins of caviar with others holding up Paper Mache models of lobsters, sushi and other luxurious foods. 2 Chainz enters the field leading a parade float labeled the "Ass Float" while Kendrick enters on a miniature car. The video ends with every girl dancing to the song with Robin Thicke.

Carrie Battan of Pitchfork praised the video, referring to it as "valiant effort to top the mania induced by 'Blurred Lines'". Lacey Seidman of VH1 described the video a "delight", commenting that Thicke "unleashes an arsenal of fun foolishness in the Diane Martel-directed video".

== Live performances ==
Thicke performed the song at the 2013 MTV Video Music Awards in a medley alongside "Blurred Lines" and Miley Cyrus's "We Can't Stop". Kendrick Lamar and 2 Chainz accompanied Thicke, performing their verses from the remixed version of the song. Phillip Mlynar of MTV News described the performance as having a "football referee–themed vibe", as Thicke donned a black-and-white stripped suit with cheerleader-themed dancers surrounding him. "Give It 2 U" was regularly performed as the opening number on Thicke's debut headlining tour, the Blurred Lines Tour (2014).

== In popular culture ==
=== Media ===
- The song appears during the party scene in the third episode of season one ("Girl, Interrupted") of The CW television series The Tomorrow People.
- The song was also featured in the 2015 comedy film Ted 2.

== Track listings and formats ==
- CD Single
1. "Give It 2 U" (featuring Kendrick Lamar) – 3:50
2. "Give It 2 U" (No Rap Version) – 2:56
- Digital download (Remix)
1. "Give It 2 U" (Remix) (featuring Kendrick Lamar & 2 Chainz) – 4:17
- Digital download (US Mix)
1. "Give It 2 U" (US Mix) (featuring Kendrick Lamar) – 3:49
- Digital download (Remix)
1. "Give It 2 U" (Norman Doray & Rob Adans Remix Radio Edit) (featuring Kendrick Lamar) – 3:54

== Credits and personnel ==
- Robin Thicke – writer, vocals
- Kendrick Lamar – writer, vocals
- will.i.am – writer, vocal production
- Dr. Luke – writer, producer, all instruments, programming
- Cirkut – writer, producer, all instruments, programming
- Serban Ghenea – mixing
- Derek "MixedByAli" Ali – engineering, recording
- Clint Gibbs – engineering
- Padraic "Padlock" Kerin – engineering
- Rachael Findlen – assistant engineer
- Dustin Capulong – assistant engineer
- Irene Richter – production coordination
- John Hanes – engineered for mix

Credits and personnel adapted from "Give It 2 U" CD single liner notes.

== Charts ==
=== Weekly charts ===
Chart (2013)	Peak position
Australia (ARIA)	41
Austria (Ö3 Austria Top 40)	62
Belgium (Ultratip Bubbling Under Flanders)	10
Belgium (Ultratip Bubbling Under Wallonia)	2
Canada Hot 100 (Billboard)	27
Canada CHR/Top 40 (Billboard)	10
Canada Hot AC (Billboard)	35
France (SNEP)	53
Germany (GfK)	36
Ireland (IRMA)	49
Netherlands (Dutch Top 40 Tipparade)	2
New Zealand (Recorded Music NZ)	29
Scottish Singles Sales (Official Charts)	16
UK Singles (Official Charts)	15
US Billboard Hot 100	25
US Hot R&B/Hip-Hop Songs (Billboard)	7
US Dance Club Songs (Billboard)	21
US Pop Airplay (Billboard)	13
US Rhythmic Airplay (Billboard)	6

=== Year-end charts ===
Chart (2013)	position
US Hot R&B/Hip-Hop Songs (Billboard)	45
US Rhythmic (Billboard)	45

== Certifications ==
Region	Certification	Certified units/sales
Australia (ARIA)	Gold	35,000^{^}
^{^} Shipments figures based on certification alone.

== Release history ==
Country	Release date	Format	Label
United States	August 27, 2013	Mainstream radio	Star Trak Entertainment; Interscope Records
Italy	November 8, 2013	Mainstream radio	Universal
