= Feel Good (Robin Thicke song) =

2013 single by Robin Thicke

Single by Robin Thicke

from the album Blurred Lines
- Released: November 12, 2013
- Genre: Pop; disco
- Length: 3:28
- Label: Star Trak; Interscope
- Songwriters: Robin Thicke; will.i.am
- Producer: will.i.am

Robin Thicke singles chronology
"Give It 2 U" (2013)	"Feel Good" (2013)	"Calling All Hearts" (2014)

Music video
- "Feel Good" on YouTube

"Feel Good" is a song by the American recording artist, Robin Thicke, from his sixth studio album Blurred Lines (2013). The song was released to Top 40 radio stations on November 12, 2013, as the album's fourth and final single. It was produced by will.i.am.

== Music video ==
A music video for "Feel Good" was directed by Sophie Muller and was premiered on December 16, 2013. A behind-the-scenes video of the music video was uploaded to YouTube on December 20, 2013.

== Track listing ==
Digital download
No.	Title	Length
1.	"Feel Good"	3:27

== Credits and personnel ==
Credits are adapted from the liner notes of Blurred Lines.

=== Location ===
The song was recorded and mixed at the Record Plant in New York City. Mastering was done at Sterling Sound in New York City.

=== Personnel ===
- Robin Thicke – songwriter, background vocals, mixing
- will.i.am – producer, songwriter
- Gelly Kusuma – engineer
- Chris Gehringer – mastering

== Charts ==
Chart (2013)	Peak position
Belgium (Ultratip Bubbling Under Flanders)	45
Belgium (Ultratip Bubbling Under Wallonia)	23
France (SNEP)	137
US Pop Airplay (Billboard)	37

== Release history ==
Country	Release date	Format
Worldwide	November 12, 2013	Digital download
United States	November 12, 2013	Mainstream airplay
