= Love After War (song) =

Single by Robin Thicke

from the album Love After War
- Released: October 11, 2011
- Recorded: 2011
- Genre: Pop; R&B; blue-eyed soul
- Length: 3:16
- Label: Interscope; Star Trak
- Songwriters: Robin Thicke; Marvin Gaye; Leon Ware
- Producers: Polow da Don; Hollywood Hot Sauce

Robin Thicke singles chronology
"Sex Therapy" (2009)	"Love After War" (2011)	"Blurred Lines" (2013)

"Love After War" is a song by American recording artist Robin Thicke. The R&B ballad is the lead single from his fifth studio album Love After War (2011). It was released to the radio on October 20, 2011, reaching number 14 on the US Hot R&B/Hip-Hop Songs chart.

== Music video ==
The music video for "Love After War," directed by Hype Williams, premiered on November 21, 2011. It features Thicke's wife, actress Paula Patton.

== Charts ==
=== Weekly charts ===
Chart (2011–2012)	Peak position
US Adult R&B Songs (Billboard)	1
US Hot 100 Airplay (Billboard)	74
US Hot R&B/Hip-Hop Songs (Billboard)	14
US R&B/Hip-Hop Airplay (Billboard)	14
US Smooth Jazz Songs (Billboard)	23

=== Year-end charts ===
Chart (2012)	Position
US Adult R&B Songs (Billboard)	5

== Release history ==
Country	Date	Format	Label
United States	October 11, 2011	Digital download	Interscope, Star Trak
United States	October 18, 2011	Urban contemporary radio	Interscope, Star Trak
United States	November 22, 2011	Smooth jazz radio	Interscope, Star Trak
