= It's in the Mornin' =

Single by Robin Thicke with Snoop Dogg

from the album Sex Therapy: The Session
- Released: March 2010
- Genre: R&B; hip hop
- Length: 3:01
- Label: Star Trak; Interscope
- Songwriters: Calvin Broadus; Robin Thicke; Teddy Riley; Jay Mathis
- Producers: Teddy Riley; Robin Thicke (co.)

Robin Thicke singles chronology
"Rollacoasta" (2010)	"It's in the Mornin'" (2010)	"Shakin' It 4 Daddy" (2011)

Snoop Dogg singles chronology
"That Tree" (2010)	"It's in the Mornin'" (2010)	"Get 'Em Girls" (2010)

"It's in the Mornin'" is a song by American R&B singer Robin Thicke with American rapper Snoop Dogg. The song was released on 2010 as the single of his fourth studio album Sex Therapy: The Session, with the record labels Star Trak Entertainment and Interscope Records.

== Music video ==
A music video for the single was shot in March 2010 with The Price Is Right's Manuela Arbeláez playing his love interest. The video premiered on May 9, 2010.

== Track listing ==
- CD Single
1. It's In The Mornin (Album Version) (with Snoop Dogg) — 3:02
2. It's In The Mornin (Instrumental) — 2:53

== Chart performance ==
=== Weekly charts ===
Chart (2010)	Peak position
US Bubbling Under Hot 100 (Billboard)	17
US Hot R&B/Hip-Hop Songs (Billboard)	25
US R&B/Hip-Hop Airplay (Billboard)	30
