= Jessi M'Bengue =

French-born model and actress (born 1989)

- Born: Jessika M'Bengue; 27 December 1989 (age 36); France
- Occupations: Model; actress; singer
- Children: 1
- Modeling information
- Height: 5 ft 9 in (1.75 m)
- Hair color: Dark brown
- Manager: Next Management
- Website: http://jessimbengue.com

Jessi M'Bengue (born 27 December 1989) is a French-born model, actress, and singer best known for playing Malika in A Meeting of the Minds and appearing in Robin Thicke's "Blurred Lines" video.

== Early and personal life ==
M'Bengue was born in the South of France. Her father is Ivorian-Senegalese and Christian, and her mother is Algerian and Muslim.

M'Bengue lives between London and Los Angeles. She has a son, born 2020, with her partner.
