= Something Else (Robin Thicke album) =

Studio album by Robin Thicke
- Released: September 30, 2008
- Length: 50:21
- Labels: Star Trak; Interscope
- Producers: Robin Thicke; Pro J; Best Kept Secret; Mark Ronson

Robin Thicke chronology
The Evolution of Robin Thicke (2006)	Something Else (2008)	Sex Therapy: The Session (2009)

Singles from Something Else
- 1. "Magic" Released: May 20, 2008; 2. "The Sweetest Love" Released: September 9, 2008; 3. "Dreamworld" Released: March 4, 2009

Something Else is the third studio album by American R&B singer Robin Thicke, released on September 30, 2008. A follow-up to The Evolution of Robin Thicke (2006) and recorded with longtime collaborator Pro-Jay, the album combines live instrumentation and influences from classic Philadelphia soul, Motown, and 1970s disco, while its lyrics broaden Thicke's focus from personal introspection to themes of social inequality, relationships, empathy, and hope. The album features a guest appearance by Lil Wayne.

Critics generally gave Something Else favorable reviews, praising Thicke's vocals, focused songwriting, and atmospheric production while noting its lack of innovation and occasional lyrical excess. Commercially, the album debuted at number three on the US Billboard 200 with 136,944 first-week copies and was certified gold by the Recording Industry Association of America (RIAA) in 2024 for 500,000 certified units. The album spawned three singles, two of which reached number two on the US Adult R&B Songs chart, including "Magic" and "The Sweetest Love."

== Background ==
In the aftermath of his commercially underperforming debut A Beautiful World (2003), Robin Thicke began work on his second album amid label uncertainty before Pharrell Williams brought him to his Star Trak imprint. Released on October 3, 2006, The Evolution of Robin Thicke marked a shift toward a softer, more mature blue-eyed soul and R&B sound, with Thicke drawing on a period of personal and professional isolation when writing much of the material. The album featured production from Thicke, Pro J and The Neptunes, with guest appearances from Faith Evans, Lil Wayne, and Williams. Although it initially debuted modestly at number 45 on the US Billboard 200, its subsequent success, driven by the single "Lost Without U," saw it climb to number five. It was subsequently certified platinum by the Recording Industry Association of America (RIAA) and sold 1,521,000 copies in the United States.

After completing his tour in support of The Evolution of Robin Thicke, Thicke immediately returned to the studio to begin recording his next album, Something Else. He described the recording process as largely collaborative and spontaneous, with many of the songs emerging from studio jam sessions, while others began as compositions he brought to the band. Unlike its predecessor, Something Else was produced entirely by Thicke and his longtime collaborator Pro-Jay. The album was recorded primarily with live instrumentation rather than synthesizers and drum machines, incorporating guitars, percussion, organs, Wurlitzer and Rhodes keyboards, as well as string and horn sections. Thicke described the album's sound as a blend of "classic Philly, Motown and '70s black disco" with the creativity of the Beatles and Bob Dylan, reflecting his emphasis on live instrumentation and a more organic sound.

== Composition ==
The songs on Something Else explore themes of social inequality, personal introspection, relationships, empathy, and hope. Discussing the album with Billboard, Thicke said he felt that much contemporary music sounded similar and that the recession and war had created a need for "something new, something else," which he viewed as an opportunity for change and hope. In an interview with Blues & Soul, he similarly explained that the album's title reflected both the social climate of the United States and a desire to move beyond the self-reflective themes of The Evolution of Robin Thicke. Whereas that album had largely drawn on his own loneliness and uncertainty, Thicke said Something Else focused more heavily on other people's experiences and his desire to connect with and embrace his audience. He also associated the album's emphasis on hope with the broader cultural atmosphere surrounding the 2008 United States presidential election and Barack Obama's campaign for change.

The album's lyrical perspective was also influenced by Thicke's interest in the social and political themes of early 1970s soul. He viewed the period as one in which artists transformed the struggles of the preceding decade into messages of optimism, celebration, and empowerment, an approach he sought to reflect in Something Else. "Dreamworld" imagines an idealized society without poverty, racism, and other social problems, drawing partly on Thicke's marriage to Paula Patton and his observations of her experiences as a black woman. "Tie My Hands" was written in response to the devastation caused by Hurricane Katrina i in 2005 and Thicke's frustration over being unable to help those affected. He later played an early version of the song for New Orleans rapper Lil Wayne, who was moved by it; the two eventually recorded the track in 2008 after Wayne contacted Thicke about collaborating, marking their third collaboration following "Shooter" and "All Night Long".

Thicke also incorporated personal experiences into "Shadow of Doubt", which he wrote following an appearance on The Oprah Winfrey Show. Although the appearance was well received, he felt uneasy and unprepared, inspiring a song about the persistent feelings of inadequacy that can accompany professional success. Elsewhere, songs such as "The Sweetest Love" and "You're My Baby" reflect the album's more optimistic and romantic side, which Thicke associated with the atmosphere of Paris, where he wrote portions of the album. He described New York as an influence on the driving, groove-oriented songs "Sidestep" and "Something Else", while the romantic atmosphere he experienced in Paris contributed to the more positive tone of several of the album's love songs. Thicke also cited Michael Jackson's idealism and uplifting music as another influence, working with musicians who had performed on Jackson's "Wanna Be Startin' Somethin'".

== Critical reception ==
Professional ratings
Aggregate scores
Source	Rating
Metacritic	72/100
Review scores
Source	Rating
AllMusic	4/5 stars
Blender	2.5/5 stars
Robert Christgau	(2-star Honorable Mention)
Entertainment Weekly	B+
Rolling Stone	3/5 stars
Slant Magazine	3/5 stars
USA Today	3/4 stars
Yahoo! Music UK	8/10 stars

Something Else received generally favorable reviews from critics who compared his voice and style to Marvin Gaye. At Metacritic, which assigns a normalized rating out of 100 to reviews from mainstream critics, the album has an average score of 72 based on ten reviews. AllMusic editor Andy Kellman worte that while "his sources remain numerous, this is [Thicke]'s most focused, least scattered, and least dilettantish set, and it benefits greatly from its brevity relative" to The Evolution of Robin Thicke." In her review for Entertainment Weekly, Leah Greenblatt noted: "There may be very little here that is truly innovative, but Thicke proves that new dogs do old tricks pretty well."

Sarah Rodman from The Boston Globe felt that "amid the attempts at sexual healing and cosmic, eco-soul unity, Thicke crafts some beautiful atmospheres. Lilting Latin-pop grooves punctuated with congas and guiros melt into tremulous pop symphonies that are equally influenced by the marching orders of Sgt. Pepper and the mist of the purple rain." Billboard's Mikael Wood remarked that Something Else "picks up right where Thicke left off with the last album's hit single, "Lost Without U." Given his weakness for bongos and syrupy strings, the new set isn't without a whiff of schmaltz; more than once you'll think he's about to cover "Take My Breath Away." Fortunately, Thicke's strong singing—and a few winning uptempo numbers."

Jody Rosen from Rolling Stone Magazine gave a mixed review to the album, giving the album three out of five stars. She found that "as a utilitarian background soundtrack, it'll do nicely [...] but Thicke's songwriting teeters into self-parody, and his mixed metaphors – "We're just spaceships in the night/Ripping the clothes off of the past/Making a new path" — could break the mood of the randiest couples". Vibe editor Sean Fennessey called the album a "strange, refreshing amalgam: Alexander O'Neal-ish openness, Luther Vandross-style swing, Smokey Robinson-esque falsetto, even James Ingram’'s hokiness. That [Thicke] is less technically gifted than any of those artists is of concern. His voice is thin, his production a revision of other eras." Blender editor Barry Walters concluded: "Every white soul traditionalist from Hall & Oates to Duffy demands catchy, impactful songs, yet that's where Thicke is thinnest."

== Commercial performance ==
Something Else debuted and peaked at number three on the US Billboard 200, selling 136,944 copies the first week. Despite its strong debut, the album was less commercially successful than its predecessor, The Evolution of Robin Thicke, falling to number 12 in its second week with 38,577 copies sold before rebounding to number 11 the following week. The album also opened at number three on Billboard's Top R&B/Hip-Hop Albums chart. On December 6, 2024, more than 16 years after its release, Something Else was certified gold by the Recording Industry Association of America (RIAA), denoting 500,000 certified units based on shipments.

== Track listing ==
Something Else track listing
No.	Title	Writer(s)	Length
1.	"You're My Baby"	Robin Thicke; James Gass	4:16
2.	"Sidestep"	Thicke; Larry Cox II; Greg Malone; Lawrence Breaux	4:11
3.	"Magic"	Thicke; Gass	3:53
4.	"Ms. Harmony"	Thicke; Bobby B. Keyes; Robert Daniels	4:47
5.	"Dreamworld"	Thicke; Gass	4:39
6.	"Loverman"	Thicke; Keyes	4:42
7.	"Hard on My Love"	Thicke; Andrew McKay; Andre Harrell	3:36
8.	"The Sweetest Love"	Thicke	3:55
9.	"Something Else"	Thicke; Keyes	3:16
10.	"Shadow of Doubt"	Thicke; Gass	3:27
11.	"Cry No More"	Thicke	4:18
12.	"Tie My Hands" (featuring Lil Wayne)	Thicke; Gass; Dwayne Carter, Jr.	5:21

iTunes deluxe edition bonus tracks
No.	Title	Writer(s)	Length
13.	"Everybody's a Star"	Thicke; Gass; Keyes; Cox; Paula Patton	2:55
14.	"Ebb and Flow"	Thicke	4:20
15.	"I'm Coming Home"	Thicke	2:55
16.	"Magic" (Moto Blanco Remix) (featuring Mary J. Blige)	Thicke; Gass; Moto Blanco^{[a]}	7:32

Notes

- ^{^[a]} signifies a remix producer

== Personnel ==
Credits adapted from album's liner notes.

- Joshua Beckman — digital editing (track 12)
- Sharon Bennett — backing vocals (track 10)
- Miguel Bermudez — recording and mixing assistant (track 12)
- Larry Cox II — organ (tracks 1–3, 6–8, 10); Rhodes (tracks 2, 4, 11); Wurlitzer, synth keys, and backing vocals (track 7); horn and string arrangements (track 8)
- Chuck Findley — trumpet (tracks 3, 8–10)
- Brian Gardner — mastering
- Gary Grant — trumpet (tracks 3, 8–10)
- Darius "Deezle" Harrison — engineer (track 12)
- Dan Higgins — saxophone (tracks 3, 8–10)
- Sean Hurley — bass (tracks 3, 4, 6, 10)
- Tavia Ivey — backing vocals (track 10)
- Suzy Katayama — strings conductor (tracks 3, 8, 9)
- Bobby Keyes — guitars (track 2, 4, 7, 9), acoustic guitar (tracks 4, 6), sitar and banjo (track 6)
- Josef Leimberg — trumpet (tracks 2, 3, 7, 8)
- Edward Lido — recording and mixing assistant
- Lil Wayne — rap (track 12)
- Bill Malina — engineer (tracks 1–9, 11, 12), mixing (tracks 2, 7)
- Greg Malone — bass (tracks 1, 2, 7, 9, 11)
- Fabian Marasciullo — mixing (track 12)
- Andrew McKay — guitars (tracks 2–4, 6, 7, 11)
- Dwight Mikkelsen — strings conductor (track 11)
- Charlie Morillas — trombone (tracks 3, 8–10)
- Jerahm Orozco — saxophone (tracks 2, 7, 8)
- Pro J — producer (all tracks), engineer (track 5), drums (tracks 1–4, 7, 9–11), percussion (tracks 1, 2, 6, 10, 11), string arrangements (tracks 3, 8, 11), horn arrangements (tracks 3, 8), guitar (tracks 1, 3, 10), piano (tracks 3, 10), instrumentation (tracks 5–12), congas (tracks 4, 7), bongos (track 3), tambourine (track 7), bass (track 8), keyboards (track 9)
- Alfredo Rivera — flute (tracks 2, 7, 8)
- Nicole Scherzinger — backing vocals (track 9)
- Isaac C. Smith — trombone (tracks 2, 3, 7, 8)
- Sherdale Smith — backing vocals (track 10)
- Robin Thicke — lead vocals (all tracks), producer (all tracks), backing vocals (tracks 1, 3–7, 9, 10), horn arrangements (tracks 2, 3, 7–10), string arrangements (tracks 3, 8, 9, 11), piano (tracks 8, 9), percussion (tracks 8, 11), Rhodes (track 1), shaker and tambourine (track 3), sleigh bells (track 4), guitar and synthesizer (track 11), instrumentation (track 12)
- Rich Travali — mixing (tracks 1, 3, 10, 11)
- Candace Wakefield — backing vocals (track 10)
- Brian Warfield — trumpet (tracks 2, 3, 7, 8)
- Kamasi Washington — saxophone (track 3)
- La-Niece Williams — backing vocals (track 10)

== Charts ==
=== Weekly charts ===
Year-end performance for Something Else
Chart (2008)	Peak position
Dutch Albums (Album Top 100)	25
French Albums (SNEP)	92
Italian Albums (FIMI)	73
Swiss Albums (Schweizer Hitparade)	65
UK Albums (Official Charts)	83
US Billboard 200	3
US Top R&B/Hip-Hop Albums (Billboard)	3

=== Year-end charts ===
2008 year-end performance for Something Else
Chart (2008)	Position
US Billboard 200	152
US Top R&B/Hip-Hop Albums (Billboard)	40

2009 year-end performance for Something Else
Chart (2009)	Position
US Top R&B/Hip-Hop Albums (Billboard)	50

== Certifications ==
Certifications of Something Else
Region	Certification	Certified units/sales
United States (RIAA)	Gold	500,000^{‡}
^{^} Shipments figures based on certification alone.^{‡} Sales+streaming figures based on certification alone.
