= Sex Therapy (song) =

2009 R&B single by Robin Thicke

Single by Robin Thicke

from the album Sex Therapy
- Released: October 20, 2009
- Genre: R&B
- Length: 4:35
- Label: Star Trak; Interscope
- Songwriters: Robin Thicke; Ester Dean; Jamal Jones; Herb Wiener; Seymour Gottlieb; John Gluck; Walter Gold
- Producers: Polow da Don; Robin Thicke; Hot Sauce

Robin Thicke singles chronology
"Somebody to Love" (2009)	"Sex Therapy" (2009)	"Love After War" (2011)

"Sex Therapy" is a song by American R&B singer Robin Thicke. The R&B ballad is the lead single from his album Sex Therapy. The song was released to the radio on October 20, 2009. Its tune and some other elements were sampled from the 1963 number-one song "It's My Party" by Lesley Gore.

== Critical reception ==
Kelsey Paine from Billboard gave a positive review for the song, saying that: "Robin Thicke delivers his signature smooth talk on "Sex Therapy". Producers Polow Da Don and Hot Sauce set up a languorous backbeat with understated synths and soft drum kicks, while Thicke turns the heat all the way up. 'Stressed out, uptight, overworked, wound up/Unleash what you got, let's explore your naughty side,' the singer croons. 'Just let me love you, lay right here, I'll be your fantasy/Give you sex therapy.' The come-hither lyrics, accompanied by Thicke's breathy falsetto and deep bass undertones, give the song an unforced eroticism that feels ideal for lovers of romance. Thicke's stripped-down brand of R&B is of an ultra-suggestive nature, but his earnest vocal performance is what ultimately keeps it classy."

== Remix ==
The official remix features Ludacris and a short intro by Polow Da Don and was released December 17, 2009. The remix is a bonus track on the iTunes edition of Sex Therapy: The Experience as the "Luda Remix".

== Music video ==
Robin Thicke confirmed on his Twitter account that he shot the video for the song on October 24 in Los Angeles with music video director Melina Matsoukas, at the same mansion that was featured in the video for Hilary Duff's "Reach Out". The video was released on November 19. Model Saleisha Stowers made a cameo in the video.

== Track listing ==
1. "Sex Therapy" (album version) (4:36)
2. "Sex Therapy" (instrumental) (4:36)

== Credits and personnel ==
Recording and mixing

- Recorded at No Excuses Studio, Santa Barbara, California; mixed at Conway Studios, Los Angeles, California; Dockside Studios, Point Pleasant.

Personnel

- Songwriting – Ester Dean, Jamal Jones, Paul Dawson, Robin Thicke, Seymour Gottlieb
- Sample – Elements of "It's My Party" written by Walter Gold, John Gluck Jr., Herb Weiner and performed by Lesley Gore
- Production – Polow da Don, Robin Thicke
- Co-production – Hollywood Hot Sauce
- Engineering – Jeremy Stevenson
- Engineering Assistant – Brian "Fluff" Allison
- Mixing – Rich Travali

Credits adapted from the liner notes of Sex Therapy, Interscope Records, Star Trek.

== Charts ==
On the week ending January 2, 2010, "Sex Therapy" debuted at number 100 on the US Billboard Hot 100. It has also become his second number one single on the Hot R&B/Hip-Hop Songs dated March 13, 2010 after "Lost Without U" peaked at number one in 2007.

Chart (2009–2010)	Peak position
US Billboard Hot 100	54
US Billboard Hot R&B/Hip-Hop Songs	1
US Billboard R&B/Hip-Hop Digital Songs	44
US Billboard R&B/Hip-Hop Airplay	1
US Billboard Adult R&B Songs	10
US Billboard Hot 100 Airplay	20
US Billboard Mainstream R&B/Hip-Hop	2
