= For the Rest of My Life =

2013 single by Robin Thicke

Single by Robin Thicke

from the album Blurred Lines
- Released: May 21, 2013
- Genre: Soul
- Length: 4:55
- Label: Star Trak; Interscope
- Songwriters: Robin Thicke; ProJay
- Producers: Robin Thicke; ProJay

Robin Thicke singles chronology
"Blurred Lines" (2013)	"For the Rest of My Life" (2013)	"Give It 2 U" (2013)

Tamar Braxton singles chronology
"She Can Have You" (2013)	"For the Rest of My Life" (2014)	"Let Me Know" (2014)

"For the Rest of My Life" (also known as "4 the Rest of My Life") is a song by American R&B singer Robin Thicke from his sixth studio album Blurred Lines (2013). Written and produced by Thicke and ProJay, the song was serviced to urban adult contemporary radio as the second single from Blurred Lines on May 21, 2013.

== Remix ==
The official remix is a duet with R&B singer Tamar Braxton and is called "For the Rest of My Life, Pt. 2". It premiered on the Atlanta urban contemporary radio station WVEE on February 12, 2014. The remix was released as a digital single on February 25, 2014.

== Commercial performance ==
"For the Rest of My Life" impacted urban adult contemporary radio in the United States on May 21, 2013 as the second single from Blurred Lines. Billboard described the song as having a "more familiar R&B vibe" appealing to Thicke's core fan base, following the release of the international hit "Blurred Lines". It was later released digitally to the iTunes Store on June 4, 2013. "For the Rest of My Life" became Thicke's fourth number-one hit on the Billboard Adult R&B Songs chart.

== Charts ==
Chart (2013)	Peak position
France (SNEP)	82
US Hot R&B/Hip-Hop Songs (Billboard)	42
US R&B/Hip-Hop Airplay (Billboard)	25

== Release history ==
Country	Date	Format	Label
United States	May 21, 2013	Urban adult contemporary radio	Star Trak Entertainment, Interscope Records
Philippines	June 4, 2013	Digital download	Star Trak Entertainment, Interscope Records
