= Blurred Lines =

2013 single by Robin Thicke

Single by Robin Thicke featuring T.I. and Pharrell Williams

from the album Blurred Lines
- Released: March 26, 2013
- Recorded: 2012
- Studio: Glenwood Place (Burbank)
- Genre: Disco; funk; soul; pop; dance-pop; R&B
- Length: 4:25
- Label: Star Trak; Interscope
- Songwriters: Robin Thicke; Pharrell Williams; Clifford Harris Jr.; Marvin Gaye (Note: The US Court of Appeals for the Ninth Circuit determined that "Blurred Lines" plagiarized Gaye's song "Got to Give It Up"; he was posthumously added to the credits and awarded past and future royalties.)
- Producer: Pharrell Williams

Robin Thicke singles chronology
"Love After War" (2011)	"Blurred Lines" (2013)	"For the Rest of My Life" (2013)

T.I. singles chronology
"We Still in This Bitch" (2013)	"Blurred Lines" (2013)	"Pour It Up (Remix)" (2013)

Pharrell singles chronology
"Celebrate" (2012)	"Blurred Lines" (2013)	"Get Lucky" (2013)

Music videos
- "Blurred Lines" on YouTube; "Blurred Lines (Unrated Version)" on YouTube

"Blurred Lines" is a song by American singer Robin Thicke featuring American rapper T.I. and American musician Pharrell Williams from Thicke's sixth studio album of the same name (2013). Solely produced by Williams, it was released as the album's lead single in 2013, through Star Trak Recordings and Interscope Records. Thicke has said that the song's lyrics are about his then-wife Paula Patton. Musically, "Blurred Lines" is a disco, funk, soul, pop, dance-pop, and R&B track with instrumentation consisting of vocals, keyboards, bass guitar, drums, and percussion.

"Blurred Lines" spent 12 consecutive weeks atop the US Billboard Hot 100, making it the longest-running single of 2013 in the United States. In June 2018, the song was certified Diamond by the Recording Industry Association of America (RIAA). It became one of the best-selling singles of all time, with sales of 14.8 million, simultaneously breaking the record for the largest radio audience in history. The song was nominated for awards, including Record of the Year and Best Pop Duo/Group Performance at the 56th Annual Grammy Awards. The song was heavily panned by music critics, with some saying it glorified rape culture. Commercially, the song topped the charts of 25 countries and reached the top five of six others.

The music video for "Blurred Lines" was directed by Diane Martel. The music video was released with two versions, an edited version and an unrated version. In both of them, Thicke, T.I., and Williams are featured with models Emily Ratajkowski, Elle Evans, and Jessi M'Bengue performing several activities, including the models snuggling in bed with Thicke and sitting on a stuffed dog. After being on the site for just under one week, the unrated version, featuring topless models, was removed from YouTube for violating the site's terms of service. The unrated video has since been restored to YouTube. Many critics criticized both videos, calling them misogynist and sexist.

To promote the song, Thicke performed on televised live events including the 2013 iHeartRadio Music Festival, The Ellen DeGeneres Show, and a poorly received performance with American singer Miley Cyrus at the 2013 MTV Video Music Awards. The song became the subject of a legal dispute with the family of American singer Marvin Gaye and Bridgeport Music, who argued that it infringed the copyright on Gaye's 1977 single "Got to Give It Up". Williams and Thicke were found liable for copyright infringement by a federal jury in March 2015, and Gaye was awarded posthumous songwriting credit based on the royalties pledged to his estate.

== Background and production ==
In July 2012, Robin Thicke and Pharrell Williams collaborated on "Blurred Lines" during a three-day studio session. Williams developed a funk-inspired drum rhythm with syncopated cowbell patterns and a repeating two-chord sequence. Thicke then added a vocal line and lyrics centered on pursuing another man's partner. The two completed and recorded the song in about 90 minutes. Thicke and Williams wanted to get a rapper from the Southern part of the United States to be part of the song. They ended up choosing T.I. T.I. would add a rap verse to the song several months later.

In an interview with GQ's Stelios Phili, Thicke explained that he and Williams were in the studio together when he told Williams that one of his favorite songs of all time was Marvin Gaye's 1977 single "Got to Give It Up". Thicke wanted to make a song similar to "Got to Give It Up". Thicke stated that he and Williams would go back and forth and sing lines like, "Hey, hey, hey!". Thicke told the Daily Star the song was "mostly throwaway fun", but said it was inspired by him and Williams being in love with their wives, having kids, and loving their mothers. He commented that both of them have a lot of respect for women. An ad was created for Radio Shack to market the Beats Pill, a small stereo, that showed Thicke, Pharrell, and the models repeating the look of the music video, but with the models holding up the Beats Pill.

== Music and lyrics ==
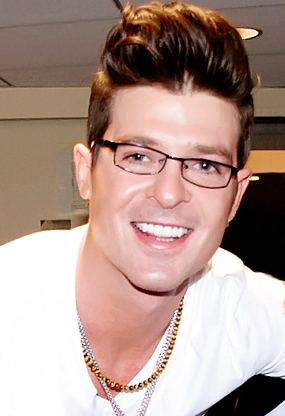
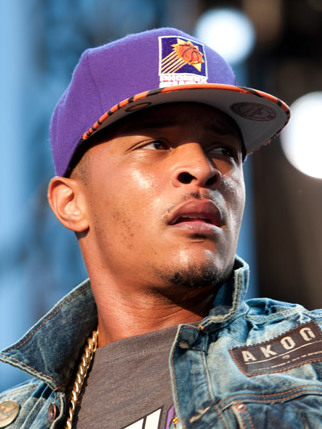
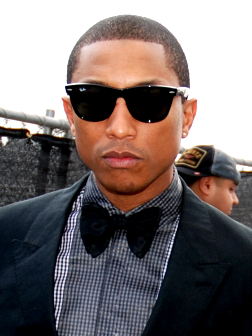
"Blurred Lines" features vocals from Robin Thicke (left), T.I. (middle), and Pharrell Williams (right).

"Blurred Lines"
A sample of "Blurred Lines"

"Blurred Lines" has been described as a disco, funk, soul, pop, dance-pop, and R&B track. Its instrumentation consists of vocals, bass guitar, keyboards, drums, and percussion. According to Emily Bootle of New Statesman, the song takes on a playful tone, with elements of humor reflected in its bassline, vocals, and lyrical content. In a review of the song and its parent album for NPR, Ken Tucker stated "the song is a come on". Tucker noted that what prevents the song from descending into creepiness is that Thicke remains "gentlemanly and debonair" when the object of his desire rejects him.

Other interpretations of the song's lyrical content were unfavorable. Elizabeth Plank of Mic considered the lyrics offensive, particularly Thicke repeatedly singing "I know you want it" while T.I. raps: "I'll give you something big enough to tear your ass in two." Sezin Koehler of Pacific Standard suggested that the lyrics imply women are expected to associate sex with pain and identified additional elements she believed had similarities to rape. Thicke told Howard Stern during an interview on The Howard Stern Show that "Blurred Lines" was inspired by his ex-wife Paula Patton. He confessed to Stern: "My wife is Mrs. Good Girl, but gradually over our marriage, I've turned her into a bad girl."

== Critical reception ==
"Blurred Lines" was heavily panned by music critics, who stated that it glorifies rape culture and encourages sexual violence against women. Tricia Romano of The Daily Beast and Elizabeth Plank of Salon.com described the music and lyrics as "rapey". Katie Halper for Raw Story opined that the track has "rape-condoning lyrics". For Bustle, Kaitlin Reilly wrote that the song's lyrics reflected language "used to excuse rape". Emma Teitel of Maclean's conceded that the song "may very well flirt with rape", noting that "many rappers have received zero flack for openly endorsing it". Writing for The Independent, Mollie Goodfellow described Thicke as the "weaselly face of the rape anthem". Callie Ahlgrim and Courteney Larocca of Business Insider commented that the song was "an awful reminder that rape culture is still incredibly prevalent", saying its "existence is a huge injustice to women everywhere". Ann Powers for NPR declared that the verse: "I know you want it" objectifies women and condones rape.

Andy Hermann for The Village Voice stated that Thicke and Williams ruined the summer of 2013 with the "smug turd of a pop tune" and deemed the song "terrible, tacky, [and] derivative". In his review for Rolling Stone, Rob Sheffield gave the song a negative review, calling it "the worst song of this or any other year". Matt Mitchell of Paste described the track as "harmful", opining he "can't say the song hasn't aged well, because it never had any merit to begin with". Dorian Lynskey of The Guardian labeled it as "the most controversial song of the decade". Annie Zaleski of The A.V. Club criticized the track for conveying a tone she considered to be demeaning, describing its themes as suggestive and exclusionary. Greg Kot from the Chicago Tribune described the song's lyrics as "dunderheaded", while saying Thicke "scrapes bottom with his single-entendre come-on's". Trevor Anderson of Billboard opined that the song continues to draw mixed reactions from critics and listeners.

Some reviews, however, were more positive. Jim Farber, writing for New York Daily News, called the song "irresistible" and mentioned it had an "utter lack of pretense". In her review for The Christian Science Monitor, Nekesa Mumbi Moody labeled the song as "undeniable", and wrote that it had become a "cultural flashpoint". The staff of Capital Xtra labeled it as an "unstoppable anthem", while the staff of The New Zealand Herald lauded the track as "cool" and "inventive". The Ledger's James C. McKinley Jr praised "Blurred Lines" as a "catchy come-on". For XXL, Dan Buyanovsky praised the track as "groovy" and likened it to "Curtis Mayfield for the molly generation", complimenting Thicke's vocals alongside T.I.'s "dependably decent verse". Brendon Veevers, writing for Renowned for Sound, emphasized Thicke's vocal range and the track's blend of rhythms with help from T.I. and Williams. Chris Barilla for Distractify mentioned that when it "came out back in 2013, it was the definitive bop of the summer".

=== Accolades ===
"Blurred Lines" was nominated for multiple awards. The staff of Rolling Stone ranked the track at number 50 on their list of the "100 Best Songs of 2013", noting its popularity during the summer and crediting its success because of Williams' hook. It was nominated for Best Collaboration and Best Song of the Summer at the 2013 MTV Video Music Awards, and for Best Song at the 2013 MTV Europe Music Awards. It was also nominated for Single of the Year at the 2013 American Music Awards. The track was nominated for Record of the Year and Best Pop Duo/Group Performance at the 56th Annual Grammy Awards, and for Best Collaboration at the 2014 BET Awards. It was nominated for Hip-Hop/R&B Song of the Year at the 2014 iHeartRadio Music Awards. "Blurred Lines" won an award for Song of the Year and Best Collaboration at the 2013 Soul Train Music Awards, and Outstanding Duo or Group at the 45th NAACP Image Awards. It also won Top Hot 100 Song, Top Digital Song, Top Radio Song, and Top R&B Song at the 2014 Billboard Music Awards.

== Music videos ==
=== Background and synopsis ===
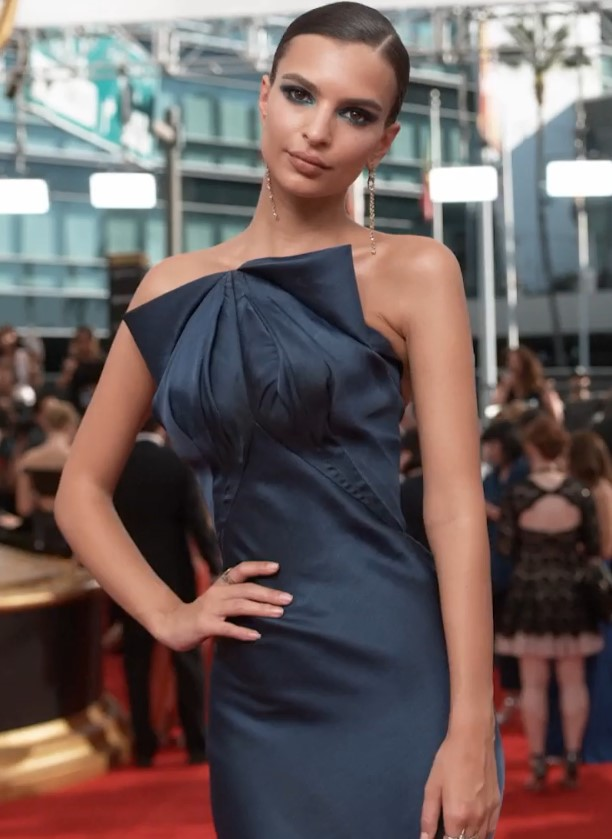
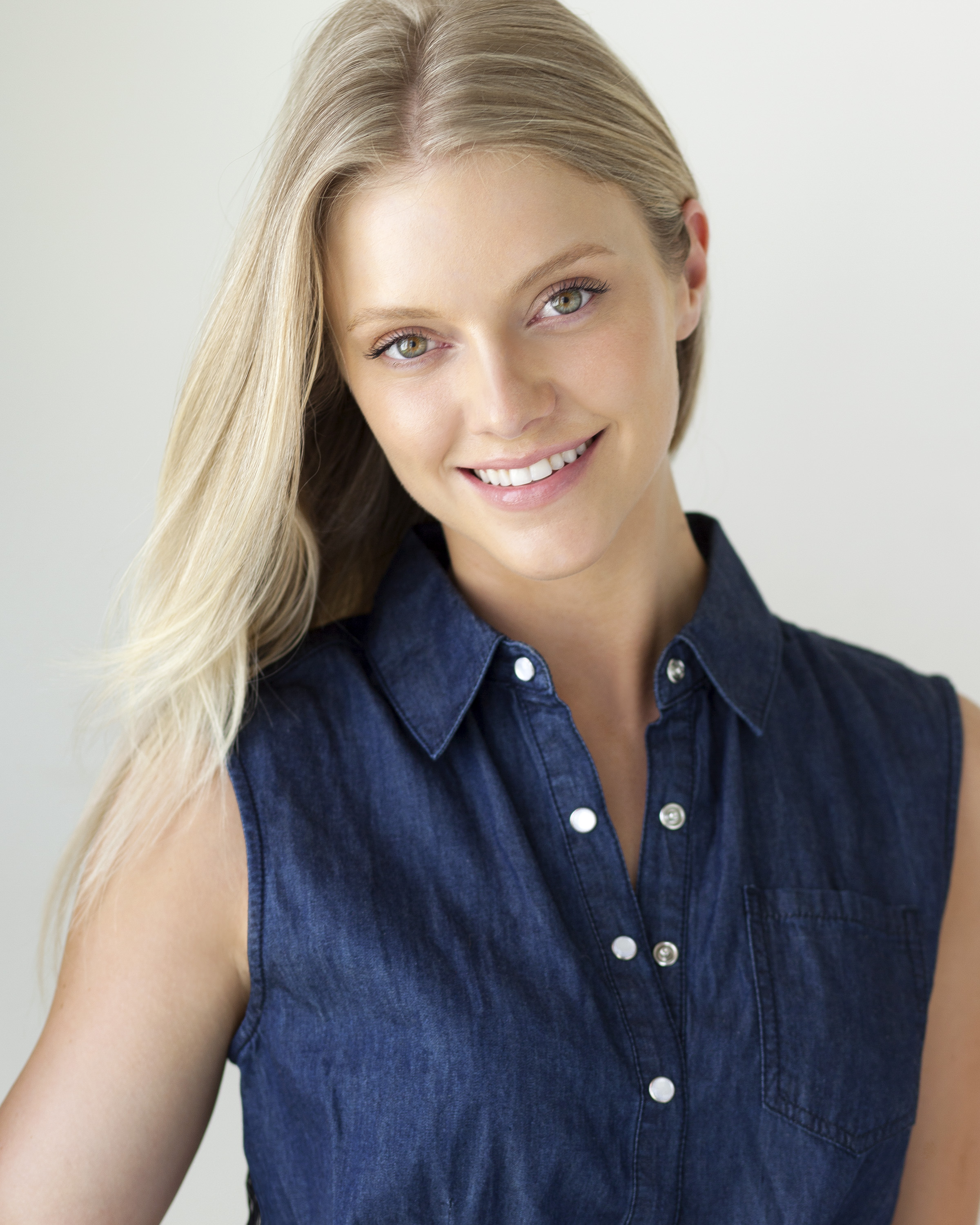
The music video for "Blurred Lines" features Emily Ratajkowski (left) and Elle Evans (right).

A music video for "Blurred Lines" was directed by Diane Martel and was released on March 20, 2013, while an unrated version was released on March 28, 2013. The unrated version of the video was removed from YouTube on March 30, 2013, citing violations of the site's terms of service that restricts the uploading of videos containing nudity, particularly if used in a sexual context. The unrated version of "Blurred Lines" generated more than one million views in the days following its release on Vevo.

In an interview with Grantland, Martel recalled that Thicke initially asked her to create a white cyc video for "Blurred Lines". After hearing the song, she developed concepts for the models' looks and props to generate attention, including oversized items selected with help from art director Georgia Walker. Martel explained that she was inspired by the work of Helmut Newton and that she intended to present the video in a way that emphasized the women's dominance over the men. She proposed producing both clothed and nude versions of the video, but declined the project when Thicke's team rejected the nude concept. They later agreed to go with both versions if she directed them.

Thicke told GQ they wanted to do "some old men dances" whilst jesting with taboo subjects such as bestiality, drug injections, and things that are "derogatory towards women". When it came to silver Mylar balloon arrangements, Thicke said it was Martel's idea. They wanted to "go over the top" and be as witless as possible. In an interview with VH1, Thicke explained that Martel wanted to do a Terry Richardson-style shoot. Thicke stated he advocated to show the women naked, mentioning that a woman's body was the "least offensive thing in the whole world" compared to "guns, violence, war", maintaining that what he enjoyed about the video was that "we're not oogling and degrading them, we're laughing and being silly with them." When describing the video's props, Thicke stated that he wanted to "take all the taboos of what you're not supposed" and "break every rule of things you're not supposed to do". He later revealed that his label Star Trak Recordings and Interscope Records initially refused to pay for the project, noting that French firm Rémy Martin helped fund the video. Thicke stated that once the label saw the finished video, their perspective changed.

Both music videos feature Thicke, T.I., and Williams dressed in suits. The visual also features three models—Emily Ratajkowski, Elle Evans, and Jessi M'Bengue—who are partially clothed in the rated version and unclothed in the unrated cut using a massive syringe, holding giant dice, and riding an oversized bicycle. Both videos include scenes with hashtags spelling Thicke's surname and silver Mylar balloons arranged to spell out "Robin Thicke Has a Big Dick". The video depicts topless models dancing alongside Thicke, T.I., and Williams, lying in bed with Thicke, and playfully posing, with one scene featuring a model holding a baby goat and another straddling a large stuffed dog while sticking her tongue out.

=== Reception ===
Reviews for both music videos were mostly negative. Solomon PM of Dazed and Kelsey McKinney of Vox opined that the video was "problematic". Kat Bein of Miami New Times described the visual as "misogynist", and said that it "objectifi[ed] naked women". Similarly, commenting on the video's concept, Demi Phillips of HotNewHipHop noted the "objectification of women", describing the visual was "perceived as promoting a disrespectful, non-consensual, and misogynistic message". Aidan Moffat for The Quietus labeled it is as "awful, sexist and asinine". Laura Snapes for The Guardian stated the "video is as objectionable as the lyrics". Jacob Uitti for American Songwriter stated the video was "sexist and chauvinist". Writing for Slate, Geeta Dayal called the video "loathsome". Andy Kellman of AllMusic labeled it as a "deliberately sexist video", opining that it "further polarized opinions". Laura Turner of BBC News criticized its feature of women with "hardly any clothes on" while the men remain "fully suited up", and added that the unrated version "alludes to bestiality and drug use".

Andrew Chow of Mic noted that the video was the "worst offender in its genre in terms of demeaning women" and used their bodies as a "publicity stunt". Chow argued that the track's quality "doesn't take away from the sexism embedded within the video", concluding that the women in the video do not "really evoke sex or glamor in a powerful way, but simply controversy". Writing for indy100, Harriet Brewis argured that women "dancing semi-naked around besuited men" who sang "jovially about how sexual consent is a grey area" was "not something we'd be proud of". Rebecca Reid for The Telegraph noted that pairing fully clothed men with semi-nude women provoked criticism and spawned parodies mocking the video's premise. Bertie Brandes of Vice criticized the video as offensive, arguing that it relied on sexist themes and uninspired imagery posed as playful provocation. She described it as being more disturbing than entertaining. The Cut's Ann Friedman mentions that her issue was not the naked women and that it being inappropriate. She opined it that featuring naked women and clothed men in "party mode is boring, uninventive, and slightly alienating".

Elias Leight, writing for PopMatters, labeled the visual as "instantly notorious", stating "the video for the song is plain silly, almost a caricature of a music video". Jordan Sargent of Spin said it was "easily one of the most fun, hilarious, and ridiculous clips we've see". Nora Caplan-Bricker of The New Republic portrayed it as an "un-self-serious, frankly goofy music video", saying it "helped redeem the song" for her. Writing for The Fader, Naomi Zeichner observed that the cast "deliver top-notch wiggles", though she noted that "T.I. might be the most fun to watch". Nick Catucci of Entertainment Weekly classified it as "infamously boobtacular". Jon Caramanica of The New York Times called the video "crisp", while Holly MacKenzie of Now described the visual as "racy". Amanda Dobbins for Vulture stated it was "one of the best videos" of 2013. David Greenwald of Billboard called it a "glammed-up video," describing the video as looking "like a live-action Terry Richardson photo". The staff of Rolling Stone stated it was "the Star Wars of the NSFW era", mentioning it was as "fun as the song itself, and twice as line-blurring". The visual was nominated for Video of the Year and Best Male Video at the 2013 MTV Video Music Awards. It was also nominated for Best Video at the 2013 MTV Europe Music Awards and Video of the Year at the 2013 Soul Train Music Awards.

=== Responses ===
In response to criticism of the video, Williams explained that the production was intended to be "a moving version of a page in Vogue". While acknowledging that it had "caused some controversy", he claimed that his "admiration for women supersedes anything I could ever say", adding that "we all come through the conduit of the bodies of beautiful women". Thicke stated that its provocative content should not have been considered controversial. He attributed the concept to Martel, noting that he preferred the version featuring clothed models and claimed he only released the unrated version after encouragement from his wife and her friends. Thicke told Digital Spy the critics needed "to come up with something more original" when calling it sexist. In February 2021, Thicke said to the New York Post that he was never going to make a video like "Blurred Lines" ever again.

Ratajkowski at first defended the video, saying she did not think it was sexist and was made with a "sarcastic attitude". She said that they were "being playful" and having a good time with their body. The model thought it was important for young women to have that confidence, and that it is actually celebrating women. She added that Martel instructed her and the other models to be "confident, silly, and slightly sarcastic". She described the set as "totally fun and comfortable" and emphasized that the performance was intended to be "playful and high-energy" with a sense of "tongue-in-cheek humor". Later in an interview with InStyle in September 2015, Ratajkowski stated the video was "the bane of my existence".

On October 3, 2021, The Sunday Times published an excerpt from Ratajkowski's memoir My Body, in which she alleged that Thicke sexually harassed her during the filming of the music video. She claimed that Thicke unexpectedly groped her, prompting her to pull away and turn toward him, noticing he appeared to be smiling. Martel confirmed Ratajkowski's account, saying she confronted Thicke at the time, having to halt production of the video and receive an embarrassed apology from Thicke.

Evans and M'Bengue also initially defended the video, expressing shock at the backlash. Evans noted that the male artists were "nothing but gentlemen" and that there "was never one inappropriate comment, not even a look." M'Bengue described the track as a "summer song" that was "not supposed to be too deep", adding that while she understood the "sexual innuendo", she "didn't feel the danger behind that". Both models expressed they were comfortable and that the video shoot was "absolutely professional", with Evans noting that the videos offered a "good way for people to creatively express their humor". Defending the unrated version, M'Bengue stated that "we shouldn't be scared of our nudity—it's beautiful, it's empowering", noting that her "body is also a part of what I perform with". M'Bengue concluded that they were simply "hired entertainers" doing "a job".

In March 2023, Evans told Bustle that the initial decision for the video was designed to make the models feel "untouchable", explaining that Martel explicitly warned them not to "be too sexy". Evans noted that she initially felt like she was "in the power position", working under the impression that the video was a playful, satirical take on male desire. Evans stated that while she never noticed anything inappropriate between Ratajkowski and Thicke, she recalled Ratajkowski leaving the shoot abruptly toward the end of production.

== Release and commercial performance ==
"Blurred Lines" was released as the lead single on March 26, 2013, from Thicke's studio album Blurred Lines (2013), through Star Trak Recordings and Interscope Records. It was released to Contemporary hit radio on May 21, 2013. It was released as a single with a remix by Filipino music producer Laidback Luke in the United Kingdom on May 24, 2013. A remix featuring Colombian singer J Balvin was released on July 23, 2013, in Colombia. A no rap version of the track was released alongside Laidback Luke's remix and both music videos. An EP featuring remixes by Laidback Luke, Australian producer Will Sparks, and American producer DallasK was made for the single. Another EP for was released for "Blurred Lines". The EP also features the Laidback Luke remix, "When I Get You Alone", "Lost Without U", "Magic", and "Sex Therapy".

"Blurred Lines" debuted at number 94 on the US Billboard Hot 100. After the song's unrated version of the video was released, the song rose from number 54 to number 11. The song reached number one in June 2013, giving T.I. his fourth, Pharrell his third, and Thicke's first number one hit in the US. "Blurred Lines" topped the Hot 100 for 12 consecutive weeks, making it the longest running single of 2013. Billboard named "Blurred Lines" the song of the summer in September 2013. On the Billboard Hot R&B/Hip-Hop Songs chart, the song reigned at number one for 16 weeks, making it one longest tracks to stay at number one on the chart. In June 2018, The single was certified diamond by the Recording Industry Association of America (RIAA), denoting track-equivalent sales of 10,000,000 units in the US based on sales and streams.

The song also peaked at number one on the Billboard Adult Top 40, Mainstream Top 40, and Rhythmic charts. In the United Kingdom, the song debuted at number one on the UK Singles Chart, selling 190,000 copies in its first week. The remained at number one the following week, selling 200,000 copies. It spent five non-consecutive weeks at number one. "Blurred Lines" was confirmed to have sold 1 million copies on its 50th day of release, becoming Williams' second song in only a month to achieve that feat in Britain after being featured on Daft Punk single "Get Lucky". According to the Official Charts Company, the single became Britain's best-selling single of 2013 with sales of 1,472,681 copies. It became one of the best-selling singles of all time, with sales of 14.8 million, simultaneously breaking the record for the largest radio audience in history.

== Controversy and criticism ==
Upon its release, "Blurred Lines" faced criticism from commentators for trivializing sexual violence, objectifying women, and perpetuating rape myths. Katie Russell, a spokeswoman for Rape Crisis England & Wales, a feminist charity that raises awareness and understanding of sexual violence, said the lyrics glamorized violence against women and reinforced rape myths. She argued that the song's lyrics and music video objectified and demeaned women, contending that many considered it offensive and outdated. She concluded by saying certain lyrics are "explicitly sexually violent and appear to reinforce victim-blaming rape myths."

In the United Kingdom, some universities banned the song from use at student events. At the University of Edinburgh, students' association officials stated that the song violated its policy against "rape culture and lad banter" and promoted an unhealthy attitude towards sex and consent. It was also banned at the universities of Bolton, Derby, Kingston, Leeds and West of Scotland. Students at the University of Exeter voted against a ban but for a condemnation of the lyrics to be issued by the Students' Guild.

Williams initially defended "Blurred Lines". The singer told NPR there was nothing misogynistic about it and that he was grateful to everybody who supported the song. Further defending the song, Williams mentioned to Pitchfork that there was nothing controversial about the song and appreciated how "Blurred Lines" helped Thicke "to a place where he deserves to be vocally." In an interview with GQ in October 2019, Williams explained that he had misunderstood the backlash, assuming the song appealed to women. He stated that the song reflected elements of a "chauvinistic culture" and admitted that some of his music had reinforced those attitudes.

== Lawsuit ==
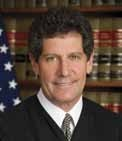
Judge John A. Kronstadt (pictured) ruled that Thicke and Williams owe Marvin Gaye's family $5.3 million.

In August 2013, Thicke, Williams, and T.I. sued Marvin Gaye's family and Bridgeport Music for a declaratory judgment that "Blurred Lines" did not infringe copyrights of the defendants. Gaye's family accused the song's authors of copying the "feel" and "sound" of "Got to Give It Up". In the lawsuit, Gaye's family was accused of making an invalid copyright claim since only expressions, not individual ideas can be protected. In September 2014, The Hollywood Reporter released files relating to a deposition from the case. Within the deposition Thicke stated that he was inebriated on Vicodin and alcohol when he showed up to record the song in the studio, and that Williams had the beat and wrote the vast majority of the song. Within Williams' respective deposition file, the producer noted that he was "in the driver's seat" during the song's creation and agreed that Thicke, in past interviews, "embellished" his contributions to the songwriting process.

On October 30, 2014, United States District Court for the Central District of California Judge John A. Kronstadt allowed Gaye family's lawsuit against Thicke and Williams to continue, concluding that the plaintiffs had presented enough evidence to suggest that "Blurred Lines" shared similarities with "Got to Give It Up". The trial was set to begin on February 10, 2015. Williams and Thicke filed a successful motion in limine to prevent a recording of "Got to Give it Up" from being played during the trial. The motion was granted because the family's copyright covered the sheet music and not necessarily other musical elements from Gaye's recording of the song. On March 10, 2015, a jury found Thicke and Williams, but not T.I., liable for copyright infringement. The unanimous jury awarded Gaye's family US$7.4 million (10,051,242 in 2025) in damages for copyright infringement and credited Marvin Gaye as a songwriter for "Blurred Lines". In July 2015, the judge rejected a new trial and the verdict was lowered from US$7.4 million to US$5.3 million (7,198,863 in 2025).

In August 2016, Thicke, Williams, and T.I. appealed the judgment to the 9th Circuit Court of Appeals. A few days later, more than 200 artists—including Rivers Cuomo of Weezer, John Oates of Hall & Oates, R. Kelly, Hans Zimmer, Jennifer Hudson, and members of Train, Earth, Wind & Fire, The Black Crowes, Fall Out Boy, The Go-Go's, and Tears for Fears—joined an amicus curiae brief authored by attorney Ed McPherson. The document argued that the jury's verdict risked penalizing songwriters for creating tracks influenced by earlier music. In December 2018, the Ninth Circuit affirmed the district court's finding of infringement against Williams and Thicke. Both singers still had to pay Gaye's family US$5.3 million. Thicke was also ordered to pay more than US$1.7 million (2,309,069 in 2025) and Williams and his publishing company had to pay US$357,631 (485,762 in 2025) in separate awards to Gaye's estate. In December 2019, Gaye's family opened the lawsuit back up again, accusing Williams of lying under oath during the trial. The plaintiffs pointed to a November 2019 GQ interview in which Williams noted that he had "reverse engineered" Gaye's "Got to Give It Up". They contended that this conflicted with his earlier deposition testimony, where he claimed he had not entered the studio intending to create something that was similar to Gaye's music. In February 2021, Judge Kronstadt determined that Williams had not committed perjury, stating that his comments in the interview were ambiguous and could be interpreted in multiple ways.

== Live performances ==
On May 14, 2013, Thicke performed the song for the first time live on NBC's The Voice alongside Williams and T.I. Thicke also performed the song on The Ellen DeGeneres Show on May 16 with Pharrell. In June 2013, Thicke performed the song alongside Williams with American actress Hayden Panettiere dancing to the song on the British television chat show The Graham Norton Show. Thicke, Williams, and T.I. performed the song on the 2013 BET Awards on June 30, 2013. They performed against a backdrop of Thicke's name in giant red block letters. Thicke also performed the track solo on BBC Radio 1 Live Lounge on July 8, 2013.

Thicke also performed the song complete with dancers in studio on The Howard Stern Show on Sirius XM Radio on July 29, 2013. He also performed the song on The Colbert Report on August 6, 2013, after French duo Daft Punk canceled. On September 20, he performed "Blurred Lines" at the 2013 iHeartRadio Music Festival. On November 10, Thicke performed the song with Iggy Azalea at the 2013 MTV Europe Music Awards. In December, he performed the song at Jingle Ball 2013 concerts. In May 2014, Williams performed the song as part of a medley at the iHeartRadio Awards where he received the iHeartRadio Innovator Award. In May 2017, Thicke performed the song at the 4th Indonesian Choice Awards.

=== MTV Video Music Awards ===
Thicke performed "Blurred Lines" as a duet with American singer Miley Cyrus at the 2013 MTV Video Music Awards, medleyed with Cyrus' "We Can't Stop" and "Give It 2 U", featuring 2 Chainz. The performance began with Cyrus performing "We Can't Stop" in bear-themed attire. Following this, Thicke entered the stage, and Cyrus stripped down to a small skin-colored two-piece outfit. Cyrus subsequently touched Thicke's crotch area with a giant foam finger and twerked against his crotch. The performance drew extensive reactions and became the most tweeted about event in history, with Twitter users generating 360,000 tweets about the event per minute; breaking the previous record held by Beyoncé's Super Bowl XLVII halftime show performance six months earlier.

Critics universally panned the performance. Shirley Halperin for The Hollywood Reporter described the performance as "crass" and "reminiscent of a bad acid trip". Writing for the American news program Today, Anna Chan called the performance "embarrassingly raunchy", while Katy Kroll of Rolling Stone labeled it a "hot mess". B. J. Steiner of XXL magazine gave the performance a negative review, labeling it as disastrous and noting that the audience appeared to respond with a mix of confusion and discomfort. Louisa Peacock and Isabelle Kerr of Telegraph described Cyrus' actions as her going into "overdrive [...] trying to kill off her Disney millstone, Hannah Montana". In July 2017, Cyrus said she felt sexualized while twerking during the performance.

=== Parodies ===
- On the June 12, 2013, episode of Jimmy Kimmel Live!, in which Thicke and Pharrell were both guests, they aired a parody version of the "Blurred Lines" video in which host Jimmy Kimmel and his sidekick Guillermo attempt to join Thicke, Pharrell, and the dancers but keep getting rebuffed.
- On August 2, 2013, Bart Baker released a parody of "Blurred Lines" on his YouTube channel.
- On September 17, 2013, a parody music video featuring then-AKB48 members Yuko Oshima and Haruna Kojima was released on YouTube as a collaboration between Thicke and AKB48 to promote the song in Japan.
- On November 5, 2013, Dave Callan, as part of his review of Just Dance 2014 on the ABC show Good Game performed a parody of the music video in response to the incorrect choreography of the song in the game.
- On December 19, 2013, the Canadian sketch comedy group Royal Canadian Air Farce released a parody of the music video called "Rob Ford's Blurred Lines".
- On July 15, 2014, "Weird Al" Yankovic released a parody of the song entitled "Word Crimes" from his album Mandatory Fun. A music video for the song was released the same day.
- In September 2021, singer Devon Cole released a rewritten version of the song on TikTok to highlight the importance of consent.
- In October 2021, Amanda Palmer and Reb Fountain uploaded a mashup of "Blurred Lines" and the Nirvana song "Rape Me" on YouTube.

== Track listing ==
- Digital download and streaming
1. "Blurred Lines" (featuring Pharrell Williams and T.I.) – 4:22
- Colombia single
1. "Blurred Lines" (featuring Pharrell Williams and J Balvin) – 4:22
- UK single
1. "Blurred Lines" (featuring Pharrell Williams and T.I.) [Clean] – 4:22
2. "Blurred Lines" (featuring Pharrell & T.I.) [Laidback Luke Remix] – 4:39
- No Rap single
1. "Blurred Lines" (featuring Pharrell Williams) [No Rap Version] – 3:50
2. "Blurred Lines" (featuring Pharrell and T.I.) [Laidback Luke Remix] – 4:40
3. "Blurred Lines" (featuring Pharrell Williams and T.I.) [Music Video] – 4:33
4. "Blurred Lines" (featuring Pharrell Williams and T.I.) [Music Video – Clean] – 4:33
- The Remixes
1. "Blurred Lines" (featuring Pharrell and T.I.) (Laidback Luke Remix) – 4:40
2. "Blurred Lines" (featuring Pharrell and T.I.) (Will Sparks Remix) – 5:08
3. "Blurred Lines" (featuring Pharrell and T.I.) (DallasK Remix) – 5:00
- EP
1. "Blurred Lines" (featuring Pharrell Williams and T.I.) – 4:23
2. "Blurred Lines" (featuring Pharrell & T.I.) [Laidback Luke Remix] – 4:40
3. "When I Get You Alone" – 3:36
4. "Lost Without U" – 4:14
5. "Magic" – 3:53
6. "Sex Therapy" – 4:35

== Credits and personnel ==
Credits and personnel adapted from Blurred Lines album liner notes.

- Robin Thicke – writer, vocals
- Pharrell Williams – writer, vocals, producer, bass, drums, guitar, keyboards
- T.I. – writer, vocals
- Marvin Gaye – writer
- Andrew Coleman – recording, digital editing, arrangement
- Todd Hurt – recording assistant
- Tony Maserati – mixing at Mirrorball Studios (North Hollywood)
- Justin Hergett – mixing assistant
- James Krausse – mixing assistant
- Chris Tabron - mixing assistant
- Chris Gehringer – mastering

== Charts ==
=== Weekly charts ===
Chart (2013–2014)	Peak position
Australia (ARIA)	1
Austria (Ö3 Austria Top 40)	1
Belgium (Ultratop 50 Flanders)	1
Belgium (Ultratop 50 Wallonia)	2
Brazil (Billboard Brasil Hot 100)	42
Brazil Hot Pop Songs	12
Canada Hot 100 (Billboard)	1
Canada AC (Billboard)	1
Canada CHR/Top 40 (Billboard)	4
Canada Hot AC (Billboard)	1
CIS Airplay (TopHit)	17
Colombia (National-Report) featuring J Balvin	7
Croatia International Airplay (Top lista)	1
Czech Republic Airplay (ČNS IFPI)	10
Czech Republic Singles Digital (ČNS IFPI)	67
Denmark (Tracklisten)	2
Euro Digital Song Sales (Billboard)	1
Finland (Suomen virallinen lista)	9
France (SNEP)	1
Germany (GfK)	1
Greece (IFPI)	1
Greece Digital Songs (Billboard)	2
Hungary (Dance Top 40)	2
Hungary (Rádiós Top 40)	1
Hungary (Single Top 40)	2
Ireland (IRMA)	1
Israel International Airplay (Media Forest)	1
Italy (FIMI)	2
Japan (Japan Hot 100)	22
Luxembourg Digital Song Sales (Billboard)	1
Mexico (Billboard Ingles Airplay)	1
Mexico Anglo (Monitor Latino)	1
Netherlands (Dutch Top 40)	1
Netherlands (Single Top 100)	1
New Zealand (Recorded Music NZ)	1
Norway (VG-lista)	2
Philippines (Over-All Top 20)	11
Poland Airplay (ZPAV)	1
Poland Dance (ZPAV)	1
Portugal Digital Song Sales (Billboard)	1
Romania (Airplay 100)	6
Russia Airplay (TopHit)	14
Scottish Singles Sales (Official Charts)	1
Slovakia Airplay (ČNS IFPI)	2
Slovenia (SloTop50)	2
South Africa (EMA)	1
Spain (Promusicae)	1
Sweden (Sverigetopplistan)	6
Switzerland (Schweizer Hitparade)	1
UK Singles (Official Charts)	1
Ukraine Airplay (TopHit)	70
US Billboard Hot 100	1
US Adult Contemporary (Billboard)	7
US Adult Pop Airplay (Billboard)	1
US Dance Club Songs (Billboard)	3
US Hot R&B/Hip-Hop Songs (Billboard)	1
US Pop Airplay (Billboard)	1
US Rhythmic Airplay (Billboard)	1
Venezuela Pop Rock General (Record Report)	1

=== Year-end charts ===
Chart (2013)	Position
Australia (ARIA)	2
Austria (Ö3 Austria Top 40)	2
Belgium (Ultratop 50 Flanders)	3
Belgium (Ultratop Flanders Urban)	2
Belgium (Ultratop 50 Wallonia)	6
Canada (Canadian Hot 100)	1
Colombia (National-Report)	39
Denmark (Tracklisten)	3
France (SNEP)	2
Germany (Media Control)	2
Hungary (Dance Top 40)	17
Hungary (Rádiós Top 40)	5
Ireland (IRMA)	1
Israel (Media Forest)	3
Italy (FIMI)	4
Japan (Japan Hot 100)	60
Moldova (Media Forest)	21
Netherlands (Dutch Top 40)	1
Netherlands (Mega Single Top 100)	2
New Zealand (Recorded Music NZ)	1
Philippines (Over-All Top 20)	19
Russia Airplay (TopHit)	62
Slovenia (SloTop50)	3
Spain (PROMUSICAE)	4
Sweden (Sverigetopplistan)	23
Switzerland (Schweizer Hitparade)	2
Ukraine Airplay (TopHit)	169
UK Singles (Official Charts Company)	1
US Billboard Hot 100	2
US Adult Contemporary (Billboard)	24
US Adult Top 40 (Billboard)	9
US Dance Club Songs (Billboard)	45
US Hot R&B/Hip-Hop Songs (Billboard)	2
US Hot Ringtones (Billboard)	5
US Mainstream Top 40 (Billboard)	1
US Radio Songs (Billboard)	1
US Rhythmic (Billboard)	1
IFPI	1

Chart (2014)	Position
Australia Urban (ARIA)	27
Belgium Urban (Ultratop Flanders)	22
Canada (Canadian Hot 100)	76
Hungary (Dance Top 40)	29
Slovenia (SloTop50)	16
US Billboard Hot 100	83
US Hot R&B/Hip-Hop Songs (Billboard)	36

=== Decade-end charts ===
Chart (2010–2019)	Position
Australia (ARIA)	36
Germany (Official German Charts)	18
Netherlands (Single Top 100)	19
UK Singles (Official Charts Company)	32
US Billboard Hot 100	14
US Hot R&B/Hip-Hop Songs (Billboard)	3

=== All-time charts ===
Chart	Position
UK Singles (Official Charts Company)	23
US Billboard Hot 100	57

== Certifications and sales ==
Region	Certification	Certified units/sales
Australia (ARIA)	9× Platinum	630,000^{^}
Austria (IFPI Austria)	Platinum	30,000^{*}
Belgium (BRMA)	Platinum	30,000^{*}
Brazil (Pro-Música Brasil)	3× Platinum	180,000^{‡}
Canada (Music Canada)	9× Platinum	706,000
Denmark (IFPI Danmark)	Platinum	30,000^{^}
France (SNEP)	Diamond	311,000
Germany (BVMI)	4× Platinum	2,400,000^{‡}
Italy (FIMI)	4× Platinum	120,000^{‡}
Mexico (AMPROFON)	3× Platinum	180,000^{*}
Netherlands (NVPI)	Platinum	20,000^{^}
New Zealand (RMNZ)	6× Platinum	90,000^{*}
Norway (IFPI Norway)	2× Platinum	20,000^{*}
South Korea (Gaon Chart) Single version	—	86,552
South Korea (Gaon Chart) Album version	—	101,293
Spain (Promusicae)	Gold	20,000^{*}
Sweden (GLF)	2× Platinum	80,000^{‡}
Switzerland (IFPI Switzerland)	3× Platinum	90,000^{^}
United Kingdom (BPI)	4× Platinum	1,630,000
United States (RIAA)	Diamond	10,000,000^{‡}
Streaming
Denmark (IFPI Danmark)	4× Platinum	7,200,000^{†}
Norway (IFPI Norway)	3× Platinum	9,000,000^{†}
^{*} Sales figures based on certification alone.^{^} Shipments figures based on certification alone.^{‡} Sales+streaming figures based on certification alone.^{†} Streaming-only figures based on certification alone.

== See also ==
- 2013 in American music
- List of best-selling singles
- List of best-selling singles in the United States
- List of best-selling singles in Australia
- List of highest-certified digital singles in the United States
- List of million-selling singles in the United Kingdom
- List of Billboard Hot 100 number-one singles of 2013
- List of Billboard Hot 100 top 10 singles in 2013
- List of number-one R&B/hip-hop songs of 2013 (U.S.)
- List of Hot 100 number-one singles of 2013 (Canada)
- List of number-one singles of 2013 (Australia)
- List of number-one singles of 2013 (South Africa)
- Word Crimes, the Weird Al parody of the song.
