= The Sweetest Love =

Single by Robin Thicke

from the album Something Else
- Released: September 9, 2008
- Recorded: 2008
- Genre: R&B; soul; smooth jazz
- Length: 3:55
- Label: Interscope; Star Trak
- Songwriter: Robin Thicke
- Producer: Robin Thicke

Robin Thicke singles chronology
| "Magic" (2008) | "The Sweetest Love" (2008) | "Dreamworld" (2009) |

"The Sweetest Love" is a song by American R&B singer Robin Thicke. The R&B ballad is the follow-up single to the moderately successful "Magic" and is the second official single from Something Else. The song was released to radio on September 9, 2008.

== Charts ==
The single charted on various amounts of Billboard charts in late November/early December 2008 and peaked at #20 on Billboard's Hot R&B/Hip-Hop Songs. While successful on many other Billboard R&B charts, "The Sweetest Love" has not been successful on many mainstream or pop charts. For example, the single has only peaked at #5 on Billboard's Bubbling Under Hot 100 Singles Chart, (which would actually be equivalent to #105 if the Hot 100 singles went beyond 100 positions).

=== Chart positions ===
| Chart (2008–09) | Peak position |
|---|---|
| U.S. Billboard Bubbling Under Hot 100 Singles | 5 |
| U.S. Billboard Hot R&B/Hip-Hop Songs | 20 |
| U.S. Billboard Mainstream R&B/Hip-Hop | 35 |
| U.S. Billboard Adult R&B Songs | 2 |
| U.S. Billboard R&B/Hip-Hop Airplay | 20 |
| U.S. Billboard Hot 100 Airplay | 75 |

=== Year-end charts ===
| Chart (2009) | Position |
|---|---|
| US Hot R&B/Hip-Hop Songs (Billboard) | 72 |

== Music video ==
The music video premiered on Yahoo! Music on November 13 and later was released on MTV's TRL. It shows Thicke playing the piano, and at bed with model Jessica White. It was directed by fashion photographer Marc Baptiste.
