= Dreamworld (Robin Thicke song) =

Single by Robin Thicke

from the album Something Else
- Released: March 4, 2009
- Genre: R&B; soul
- Length: 4:39
- Label: Star Trak / Interscope
- Songwriters: Robin Thicke; James Gass; Max

Robin Thicke singles chronology
"The Sweetest Love" (2009)	"Dreamworld" (2009)	"Somebody to Love" (2009)

"Dreamworld" is a song by American R&B singer Robin Thicke. It is the fifth track from his third studio album Something Else. It was released as the third and final single from the album on March 4, 2009. It did not enter the R&B/Hip-Hop Songs chart, but peaked at number 10 on Bubbling Hot R&B/Hip-Hop Songs and number 32 on Hot Adult R&B Airplay. A music video for the song was released in 2009. It was directed by Anthony Mandler.

== Charts ==
Chart (2009)	Peak position
US Bubbling Under R&B/Hip-Hop Singles	10
US Hot Adult R&B Airplay	32
