= Blurred Lines (album) =

2013 studio album by Robin Thicke

- Standard album cover. The deluxe edition is all blue or red

Studio album by Robin Thicke
- Released: July 12, 2013
- Recorded: 2012–2013
- Studios: Glenwood Place (Burbank); Guillaume Tell (Paris); Hit Factory Criteria (Miami); Jungle City (New York); Hansen; Blue Jay (Carlisle); Luke's in the Boo (Malibu); Record Plant (Los Angeles); TDE Red Room (Carson)
- Genres: R&B; dance-pop; funk
- Length: 42:34
- Labels: Star Trak; Interscope
- Producers: Cirkut; Dr. Luke; Pharrell; ProJay; Robin Thicke; Timbaland; will.i.am

Robin Thicke chronology
Love After War (2011)	Blurred Lines (2013)	Paula (2014)

Singles from Blurred Lines
- 1. "Blurred Lines" Released: March 26, 2013; 2. "For the Rest of My Life" Released: May 21, 2013; 3. "Give It 2 U" Released: July 2, 2013; 4. "Feel Good" Released: November 12, 2013

Blurred Lines is the sixth studio album by American singer Robin Thicke. It was first released in Germany on July 12, 2013, and released in the United States on July 30, 2013, through Star Trak Entertainment and Interscope Records, as the follow-up to his fifth studio album, Love After War (2011). An R&B, dance-pop, and funk album, it features guest appearances from T.I., Pharrell, Kendrick Lamar, and 2 Chainz. Thicke, together with Cirkut, Dr. Luke, Pharrell, ProJay, Timbaland, and will.i.am, produced the record. The album's release was preceded by the release of four singles: the title track featuring T.I. and Pharrell, "For the Rest of My Life", "Give It 2 U" featuring Lamar, and "Feel Good".

Blurred Lines received mixed reviews from music critics and debuted at number one on the US Billboard 200, giving Thicke his third US top-five album. The album reached the top five in numerous international markets, including Australia, Austria, Canada, Germany, the Netherlands, New Zealand, Scotland, Switzerland, and the United Kingdom. It was certified platinum in Austria and gold in Canada, France, Mexico, Poland, Switzerland, and the United Kingdom. To promote the album, Thicke embarked on the Blurred Lines Tour (2014), which traveled to North America and Europe, playing a total of 33 concerts. Blurred Lines was nominated at the 56th Annual Grammy Awards for Best Pop Vocal Album.

== Background and composition ==
Thicke detailed the album's concept in an interview with The Breakfast Club, stating, "The album is titled Blurred Lines. I've realized as I've gotten older that we all think we're living either in a black or white world, or on a straight path, but most of us are living right in between those straight lines. And everything you thought you knew, the older you get, you realize, 'Damn, I don't know nothing about this. I better pay attention, I better listen and keep learning.' So I think that, that's what I've been realizing these past few years."

Thicke also explained his foray into a more mainstream pop-oriented sound than his usual milieu. "The last year I've been wanting to have more fun. I think I took myself very seriously as an artist and I wanted to be like Marvin Gaye, and John Lennon and Bob Marley and these great artists and songwriters that sang about love and sang about relationships," Robin explained. "And then the last year, my wife and I just really wanted to have fun again, we wanted to be young again and we wanted to dance again and go out with our friends, so I wanted to make music that reflected that culture also."

According to AllMusic, it is an R&B album. Music critic Greg Kot called Blurred Lines a dance-pop album, while Caroline Sullivan of The Guardian characterized its music as upbeat "funk/soul". According to AllMusic's Andy Kellman, it has an array of glossy, pop-oriented dance tracks that deviate from the title track's "disco-funk" style, while other songs such as "Ooo La La" and "For the Rest of My Life" are more rooted in soul. Elias Leight of PopMatters said that the album's first half draws on the luxuriant funk and disco popular in the late 1970s, while the second half is characterized by club-oriented electronic sounds and a few ballads.

=== Copyright infringement case ===
In 2014, the family of Marvin Gaye launched a suit against Thicke and Pharrell Williams as well as EMI April – the song publisher now owned by Sony/ATV – claiming similarities between "Blurred Lines" and Gaye's 1977 song "Got to Give It Up". On March 10, 2015, the jury found that Thicke and Williams had infringed on the tune, but not rapper T.I., who was also named as a party in the suit. The eight jurors also determined that the infringement was neither willful nor innocent. According to expert witnesses and musicologists, "Blurred Lines" was found to infringe, with liability affirmed on appeal, thereby establishing a convincing argument that the song was essentially stolen from Marvin Gaye. The jury awarded the Gaye family $4 million in damages, with profits of more than $1.6 million from Williams and more than $1,760,099 from Thicke. Statutory damages of $9,375 were assessed.

== Singles ==
The album's lead single is the title track "Blurred Lines", released on March 26, 2013. It officially impacted US Rhythmic radio on April 16, 2013, and Top 40/Mainstream radio on May 21, 2013. The video was released on March 20, 2013, and garnered more than a million views in the days after release on Vevo. Thicke said he had received the approval of his wife Paula Patton before shooting the video. The single peaked at number 1 on the Billboard Hot R&B/Hip-Hop Songs chart, as well as the Billboard R&B Songs chart. It became Thicke's most successful song on the US Billboard Hot 100, being his first to reach number 1 (he previously climbed as high as number 14 with "Lost Without U", back in 2007). The song reached number 1 in Australia, Canada, New Zealand, Ireland, the Netherlands, the United Kingdom, and the United States, as well as the top 10 in Belgium, Denmark, Lithuania, France, Iceland, Italy, Portugal, and Switzerland.

The album's second single, "For the Rest of My Life", impacted urban adult contemporary radio on May 21, 2013 and was released digitally on June 3, 2013. The album's third single, "Give It 2 U" which features American rapper Kendrick Lamar, was released on July 2, 2013. "Give It 2 U" impacted Top 40/Mainstream radio in the United States on August 27, 2013. "Feel Good" was released as the album's fourth single. It also impacted US Top 40 radio on November 12, 2013.

== Critical reception ==
Professional ratings
Aggregate scores
Source	Rating
Metacritic	59/100
Review scores
Source	Rating
AllMusic	3.5/5 stars
The A.V. Club	B+
Billboard	3.5/5 stars
Chicago Tribune	2/4 stars
Entertainment Weekly	C+
The Guardian	2/5 stars
The Independent	2/5 stars
Los Angeles Times	2/4 stars
Rolling Stone	3.5/5 stars
Spin	8/10

According to the review aggregator Metacritic, Blurred Lines received "mixed or average reviews" based on a weighted average score of 59 out of 100 from 22 critic scores.

Nick Catucci of Entertainment Weekly found its music predictable and characterized by unadventurous "boutique-lounge grooves." Slant Magazine's Andrew Chan felt that, while the album has "an effervescent start", Thicke offers little to contemporary R&B on an album marred by "narcissistic come-ons" and "blunt pronouncements". Caroline Sullivan of The Guardian said that Thicke's "blunt-instrument romantic technique" lacks dignity and keeps Blurred Lines from being "a pretty good album." In her review for The Observer, Hermione Hoby wrote that some of the songs are "passable party pabulum", while Thicke's obnoxious lyrics make the album less entertaining. Greg Kot of the Chicago Tribune said that his distasteful lyrics ruin the music's exciting mood.

In a positive review, Rolling Stone magazine's Rob Tannenbaum called it an optimistic, "near-perfect summer record" that improves over Thicke's previous albums, which he felt were dulled with his "expressions of angst". Annie Zale of The A.V. Club praised Blurred Lines for both its "sincere" songs, including "For the Rest of My Life" and "The Good Life", and for the less introspective songs' "playfulness", which she felt is the album's most appealing quality. In his review for USA Today, Brian Mansfield believed that Thicke's braggadocio improves the tastelessly sexual songs and that the lyrics "may make listeners laugh, wince or even groan, but that doesn't mean they won't get turned on, too." Spin magazine's Keith Harris wrote that Thicke "exaggerates and sings the hell out of" the limitations of his pickup artist character.

== Commercial performance ==
In North America, Blurred Lines peaked at number 1 on the US Billboard 200, the US Top R&B/Hip-Hop Albums, and the Billboard Canadian Albums. It was certified gold in Canada by Music Canada and in Mexico by Asociación Mexicana de Productores de Fonogramas y Videogramas (AMPROFON).

In Europe, Blurred Lines peaked at number 5 in Austria, numbers 19 and 17 in the Flanders and Wallonia regions of Belgium, number 13 in Denmark, number 10 in France, number 2 in Germany, number 34 in Italy, number 3 in the Netherlands, number 15 in Norway, number 20 in Poland, number 15 in Portugal, number 1 on the Scottish Albums Chart, number 42 in Spain, number 1 in Switzerland, number 1 on the UK Albums Chart, and number 13 on the UK Hip Hop and R&B Albums Chart. It was certified platinum in Austria by IFPI Austria and gold in France by Syndicat National de l'Édition Phonographique (SNEP), in Poland by the Polish Society of the Phonographic Industry (ZPAV), in Switzerland by IFPI Switzerland, and in the United Kingdom by the British Phonographic Industry (BPI).

In Asia, Blurred Lines peaked at number 30 in China. In Oceania, it peaked at number 4 in Australia and number 5 in New Zealand.

== Track listing ==
No.	Title	Writer(s)	Producer(s)	Length
1.	"Blurred Lines" (featuring T.I. and Pharrell)	Robin Thicke; Pharrell Williams; Clifford Harris, Jr.; Marvin Gaye^{1}	Pharrell	4:23
2.	"Take It Easy on Me"	Timothy Mosley; Thicke; Jerome Harmon; Jacob Luttrell; Timothy Clayton; Chris Godbey	Timbaland; Jerome "J-Roc" Harmon^{[c]}	3:47
3.	"Ooo La La"	Thicke; Joe Augello	Thicke; ProJay	4:38
4.	"Ain't No Hat 4 That"	Thicke; Augello; Alan Thicke	Thicke; ProJay	3:20
5.	"Get in My Way"	Thicke; ProJay; Max^{2}	Thicke; ProJay	3:11
6.	"Give It 2 U" (featuring Kendrick Lamar)	Thicke; Kendrick Duckworth; William Adams; Lukasz Gottwald; Henry Walter	Dr. Luke; Cirkut	3:49
7.	"Feel Good"	Thicke; Adams	will.i.am	3:28
8.	"Go Stupid 4 U" (included on later pressings)	Thicke; Adams; Edward Fletcher; Clifton Chase; Sylvia Robinson; Melvin Glover; Jorge Silva	will.i.am	4:29
9.	"4 the Rest of My Life"	Thicke; ProJay	Thicke; ProJay	4:55
10.	"Top of the World"	Thicke; ProJay	Thicke; ProJay	3:22
11.	"The Good Life"	Thicke	Thicke; ProJay	3:12
Total length:				42:34

UK iTunes bonus track^{3}
No.	Title	Writer(s)	Producer(s)	Length
11.	"Blurred Lines" (Cave Kings Remix) (featuring T.I. and Pharrell)	Thicke; Williams; Harris, Jr.	Pharrell	5:49

Deluxe edition bonus tracks
No.	Title	Writer(s)	Producer(s)	Length
12.	"Pressure"	Thicke; Niles Hollowell-Dhar	The Cataracs	3:46
13.	"Put Your Lovin on Me"	Thicke; Hollowell-Dhar	The Cataracs	3:51
14.	"Give It 2 U" (Remix) (featuring Kendrick Lamar and 2 Chainz)	Thicke; Duckworth; Tauheed Epps; Adams; Gottwald; Walter	Dr. Luke; Cirkut	4:17
Total length:				54:28

Target deluxe edition bonus tracks
No.	Title	Writer(s)	Producer(s)	Length
15.	"Blurred Lines" (Bee's Knees Remix) (featuring T.I. and Pharrell)	Thicke; Williams; Harris, Jr.	Pharrell	4:39
16.	"4 the Rest of My Life" (Twice as Nice Remix)	Thicke; ProJay	Thicke; ProJay	3:17
Total length:				62:24

Notes

- ^[c] signifies a co-producer.
- "Go Stupid 4 U" contains excerpts from "Tive Razão", written and performed by Seu Jorge, and excerpts from "The Message", written by Edward G. Fletcher, Clifton Nathaniel Chase, Sylvia Robinson, and Melvin Glover, and performed by Grandmaster Flash and the Furious Five.

== Personnel ==
=== Musicians ===
- Robin Thicke – vocals (all tracks), keyboards (tracks 3–5, 9–13), background vocals (3, 4, 7–11), string arrangement (3, 11)
- Pharrell Williams – instruments (1)
- Andrew Coleman – arrangement (1)
- Joseph Augello – bass guitar (3–5); guitars, drums, percussion (3); lead guitar (4, 5, 11)
- Suzie Katyama – string arrangement (3, 11), strings conductor (3, 9, 11)
- ProJay – drums (4, 5, 9–11), percussion (4, 5, 10, 11), bass guitar (9–11), string arrangement (9), lead guitar (10)
- Lemar Guillary – trombone (4, 5, 10, 11)
- Rashawn Ross – trumpet (4, 5, 10)
- Donald Hayes – alto saxophone, tenor saxophone (4, 5, 11)
- Dr. Luke – all instruments, programming (6, 14)
- Cirkut – all instruments, programming (6, 14)
- Kendrick Lamar – vocals (6, 14)
- Bobby Keyes – guitar (9)
- Brandon Phillips – trumpet (11)
- Niles Hollowell-Dhar – all instruments (12, 13)

=== Technical ===
- Chris Gehringer – mastering
- Tony Maserati – mixing (1, 3–5, 9–11)
- Demacio "Demo" Castellon – mixing, recording (2)
- Serban Ghenea – mixing (6, 14)
- Robin Thicke – mixing (7, 8)
- Robert Orton – mixing (12, 13)
- John Hanes – mix engineering (6, 14)
- Andrew Coleman – recording, digital editing (1)
- Denis Caribaux – recording for Robin Thicke (2)
- Chris Godbey – recording (2)
- Bill Malina – engineering (3, 9, 11)
- ProJay – recording (4, 5, 10)
- Derek "MixedByAli" Ali – engineering, recording for Kendrick Lamar (6, 14)
- Clint Gibbs – engineering (6, 14)
- Padraic "Padlock" Kerin – engineering (6, 14)
- Gelly Kusuma – recording (7, 8, 12, 13)
- Justin Hergett – mixing assistance (1, 3–5, 9–11)
- James Krausse – mixing assistance (1, 3–5, 9–11)
- Todd Hurt – recording assistance (1)
- Julian Vasquez – engineering assistance (2)
- Rachael Findlen –engineering assistance (6, 14)
- Dustin Capulong – engineering assistance (6, 14)

=== Visuals ===
- Young & Sick – art direction, packaging
- Terry Richardson – photography
- Todd Russell – custom typography

== Charts ==
=== Weekly charts ===
Weekly chart performance for Blurred Lines
Chart (2013)	Peak position
Australian Albums (ARIA)	4
Austrian Albums (Ö3 Austria)	5
Belgian Albums (Ultratop Flanders)	19
Belgian Albums (Ultratop Wallonia)	17
Canadian Albums (Billboard)	1
Chinese Albums (Sino Chart)	30
Danish Albums (Hitlisten)	13
Dutch Albums (Album Top 100)	3
French Albums (SNEP)	10
German Albums (Offizielle Top 100)	2
Italian Albums (FIMI)	34
New Zealand Albums (RMNZ)	5
Norwegian Albums (VG-lista)	15
Polish Albums (ZPAV)	20
Portuguese Albums (AFP)	15
Scottish Albums (Official Charts)	1
Spanish Albums (Promusicae)	42
Swiss Albums (Schweizer Hitparade)	1
UK Albums (Official Charts)	1
UK R&B Albums (Official Charts)	13
US Billboard 200	1
US Top R&B/Hip-Hop Albums (Billboard)	1

=== Year-end charts ===
2013 year-end chart performance for Blurred Lines
Chart (2013)	Position
Australian Urban Albums (ARIA)	16
Belgian Albums (Ultratop Flanders)	181
Belgian Albums (Ultratop Wallonia)	148
Canadian Albums (Billboard)	39
French Albums (SNEP)	157
Swiss Albums (Schweizer Hitparade)	97
UK Albums (OCC)	92
US Billboard 200	36
US Top R&B/Hip-Hop Albums (Billboard)	11

2014 year-end chart performance for Blurred Lines
Chart (2014)	Position
US Billboard 200	130
US Top R&B/Hip-Hop Albums (Billboard)	26

=== Decade-end charts ===
Decade-end chart performance for Blurred Lines
Chart (2010–2019)	Position
US Billboard 200	143

== Certifications ==
Certifications for Blurred Lines
Region	Certification	Certified units/sales
Austria (IFPI Austria)	Platinum	15,000^{*}
Canada (Music Canada)	Gold	40,000^{^}
France (SNEP)	Gold	50,000^{*}
Mexico (AMPROFON)	Gold	30,000^{^}
Poland (ZPAV)	Gold	10,000^{*}
Switzerland (IFPI Switzerland)	Gold	10,000^{^}
United Kingdom (BPI)	Gold	100,000^{^}
^{*} Sales figures based on certification alone.^{^} Shipments figures based on certification alone.

== Release history ==
Release history for Blurred Lines
Country	Date	Label	Ref.
Germany	July 12, 2013	Interscope (Universal)	
France	July 15, 2013	Polydor	
United Kingdom	July 15, 2013	Polydor	
United States	July 30, 2013	Interscope	
Canada	July 30, 2013	Interscope	
Japan	August 7, 2013	Universal International	
China	October 27, 2013	Starsing Culture	

== Notes ==
1. Gaye was not credited as a songwriter, but a court later ruled that the song plagiarized Gaye's song "Got to Give It Up".
2. Max is a pseudonym used by Paula Patton, Thicke's ex-wife.
3. As with most international editions, the UK iTunes edition does not include the track "Go Stupid 4 U", so this edition has the Cave Kings remix of "Blurred Lines" as track 11.
