= Magic (Robin Thicke song) =

Single by Robin Thicke

from the album Something Else
- Released: May 20, 2008 (U.S.) August 9, 2008 (Europe)
- Genre: R&B; soul
- Length: 3:53 (album version); 3:35 (radio edit)
- Label: Interscope; Star Trak
- Songwriters: Robin Thicke; James Gass; Paula Patton
- Producers: Robin Thicke; Best Kept Secret; Mark Ronson

Robin Thicke singles chronology
"Got 2 Be Down" (2007)	"Magic" (2008)	"The Sweetest Love" (2008)

"Magic" is a song by American R&B singer Robin Thicke. The song was produced in 2008 for Thicke's third studio album, Something Else. Its live instrumentation varied, including conga, horn and violin. The song's lyrics refer to a someone reversing their lovers past hurts in relationships, and uses magic metaphors. The song was written by him along with his ex-wife Paula Patton and James Gass. The track was sent to radio on May 20, 2008 and is the album's lead single.

== Music video ==
The music video for "Magic" premiered on Thursday July 17, 2008 on BET's 106 & Park. It was directed by the British director Robert Hales (who also directed Britney Spears' "Break the Ice") and Thicke himself. On August 8, 2008, the video debuted on 106 & Park at number nine, and peaked at number six. BET J placed it at number 20 on the year-end Last Call 2008! Top 50 Countdown.

It is an example of many contemporary music videos which have a blend of modern-day computer effects along with dance moves of the past. The video's galactic theme was influenced by Janet Jackson's "Feedback", notably in scenes of Thicke and backing dancers mounting planets. Thicke also uses a replica set to what dance legend Fred Astaire used when singing "Puttin' on the Ritz". He also uses several similar steps to the ones that Fred Astaire used in the original video and that of Michael Jackson in "Smooth Criminal".

Speaking of the video in October 2008 to noted UK R&B writer Pete Lewis of the award-winning Blues & Soul, Robin stated: "For the song I just wanted to celebrate that feeling that gave people hope and made them feel good on the inside. And, with its vibe being about the endless possibilities in life and with space being the final frontier, for the video I just thought that seeing people lying on the moons and controlling the universe suited that theme of bravado very well."

== Remixes ==
The official remix is a duet remix with R&B singer Mary J. Blige and is called "Magic Touch (NYC Remix)". There are other remixes using the original version by Freeway & T.I. There is an unofficial Mick Boogie Remix featuring Jay-Z. The remix uses the first verse from Jay-Z's American Gangster. Mark Ronson co-produced w/ Best Kept Secret a remix of "Magic Touch" featuring Mary J. Blige & Wale. Rick Ross did a remix of the remixed version, "Magic Touch".

== Charts ==
"Magic" was sent to radio May 20, 2008. The song debuted on the US R&B/Hip-Hop singles chart on May 29, 2008 at number 90, and has peaked at number six, giving Thicke his second top ten on the chart. The song debuted on the Hot 100 charts on June 19, 2008 at number 88. After falling from the chart and re-entering same, it ultimately peaked at 59. It has also entered the Canadian Hot 100 chart at number 98 and peaked at number 60. The remixed version, "Magic Touch", otherwise known as the "Moto Blanco Remix" has charted on the US Hot Dance Club Play peaking at number two.

=== Weekly charts ===
Chart (2008)	Peak position
Canada Hot 100 (Billboard)	60
Canada AC (Billboard)	15
Canada CHR/Top 40 (Billboard)	26
Netherlands (Single Top 100)	33
Switzerland (Schweizer Hitparade)	64
UK Singles (Official Charts)	95
US Billboard Hot 100	59
US Adult R&B Songs (Billboard)	2
US Dance Club Songs (Billboard) "Magic Touch" featuring Mary J. Blige	2
US Dance Airplay (Billboard)	18
US Hot R&B/Hip-Hop Songs (Billboard)	6
US Pop 100 (Billboard)	78
US Hot 100 Airplay (Billboard)	39

=== Year-end charts ===
Chart (2008)	Position
UK Urban (Music Week)	2
US Hot R&B/Hip-Hop Songs (Billboard)	39

== Usage ==
"Magic" was introduced on July 13, 2008 at the Miss Universe 2008 pageant; it was the background music for the 'Evening Wear' competition of the pageant. The song was also used on the most recent Samsung U900 Soul advert for the summer, at the 2008 UAAP Cheerdance Competition in the Philippines sponsored by Samsung, and the leading food service company Jollibee to celebrate its 30th anniversary. The song was also featured in the 2011 film Jumping the Broom.
