= Jordan Knight discography =

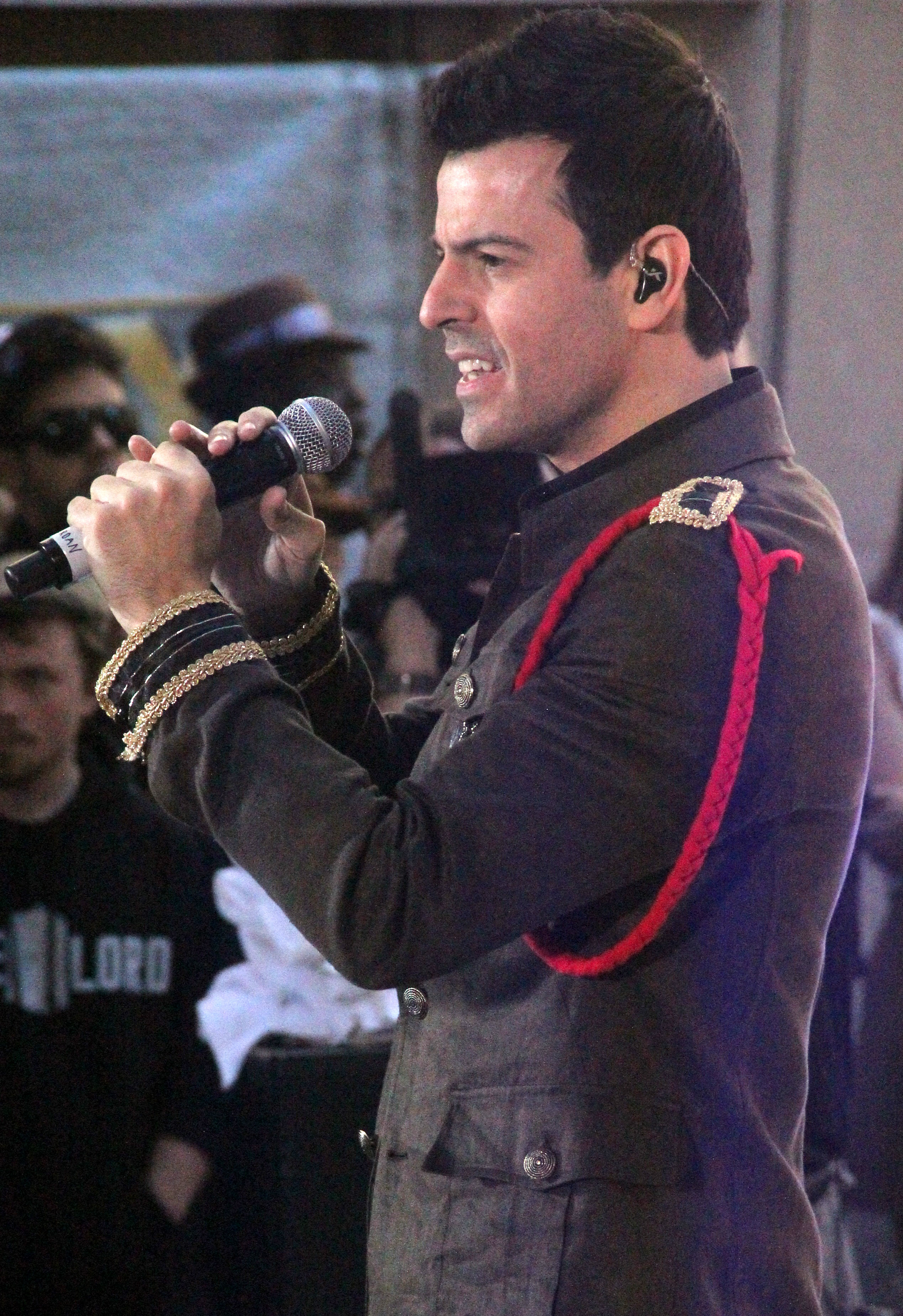
Knight in 2011

This is the discography documenting albums and singles released by New Kids on the Block member Jordan Knight.

== Albums ==
=== Studio albums ===
Title	Details	Peak chart positions		Certifications
Title	Details	US	CAN	Certifications
Jordan Knight	Released: May 25, 1999; Label: Interscope; Formats: CD, cassette	29	—	RIAA: Gold
Love Songs	Released: September 12, 2006; Label: Trans Continental; Formats: CD, cassette	—	—	
Unfinished	Released: May 31, 2011; Label: eOne Music; Formats: CD	48	55	
"—" denotes release did not chart or was not released in that country

=== Remix albums ===
- Jordan Knight Performs New Kids on the Block: The Remix Album (2004)

=== Collaborative albums ===
Title	Details	Peak chart positions	
Title	Details	US	CAN
Nick & Knight	Released: September 2, 2014; Label: Mass Appeal Entertainment, BMG; Formats: Digital download, CD	24	14

== Extended plays ==
- The Fix (2005)

== Singles ==
Title	Year	Peak chart positions							Certifications (sales thresholds)	Album
Title	Year	US	US AC	AUS	CAN	GER	IRE	UK	Certifications (sales thresholds)	Album
"Give It to You"	1999	10	—	33	11	61	30	5	RIAA: Gold	Jordan Knight
"I Could Never Take the Place of Your Man"	1999	—	—	—	—	—	—	—		Jordan Knight
"Close My Eyes"	1999	—	—	—	—	—	—	—		Jordan Knight
"Where Is Your Heart Tonight"	2005	—	12	—	—	—	—	—		The Fix
"Say Goodbye" (Duet with Deborah Gibson)	2006	—	24	—	—	—	—	—		Love Songs
"Let's Go Higher"	2011	—	—	—	—	—	—	—		Unfinished
"Stingy" (featuring Donnie Wahlberg)	2011	—	—	—	—	—	—	—		Unfinished

== Other charted songs ==
Title	Year	Peak chart positions	Album
Title	Year	CAN	Album
"One More Night"	2012	88	Unfinished

== Other songs ==
- "Angel of Love" featuring Ana (Body Language)
- "Can I Come Over Tonight?" (also a bonus track on the UK edition of Jordan Knight)
- "My Heart's Saying Now" (Snow Day soundtrack)
- "Your Vibe" (Popstar soundtrack)
- "One on One" (Best Buy bonus track from Love Songs, Hall & Oates cover).
