= Colby O'Donis discography =

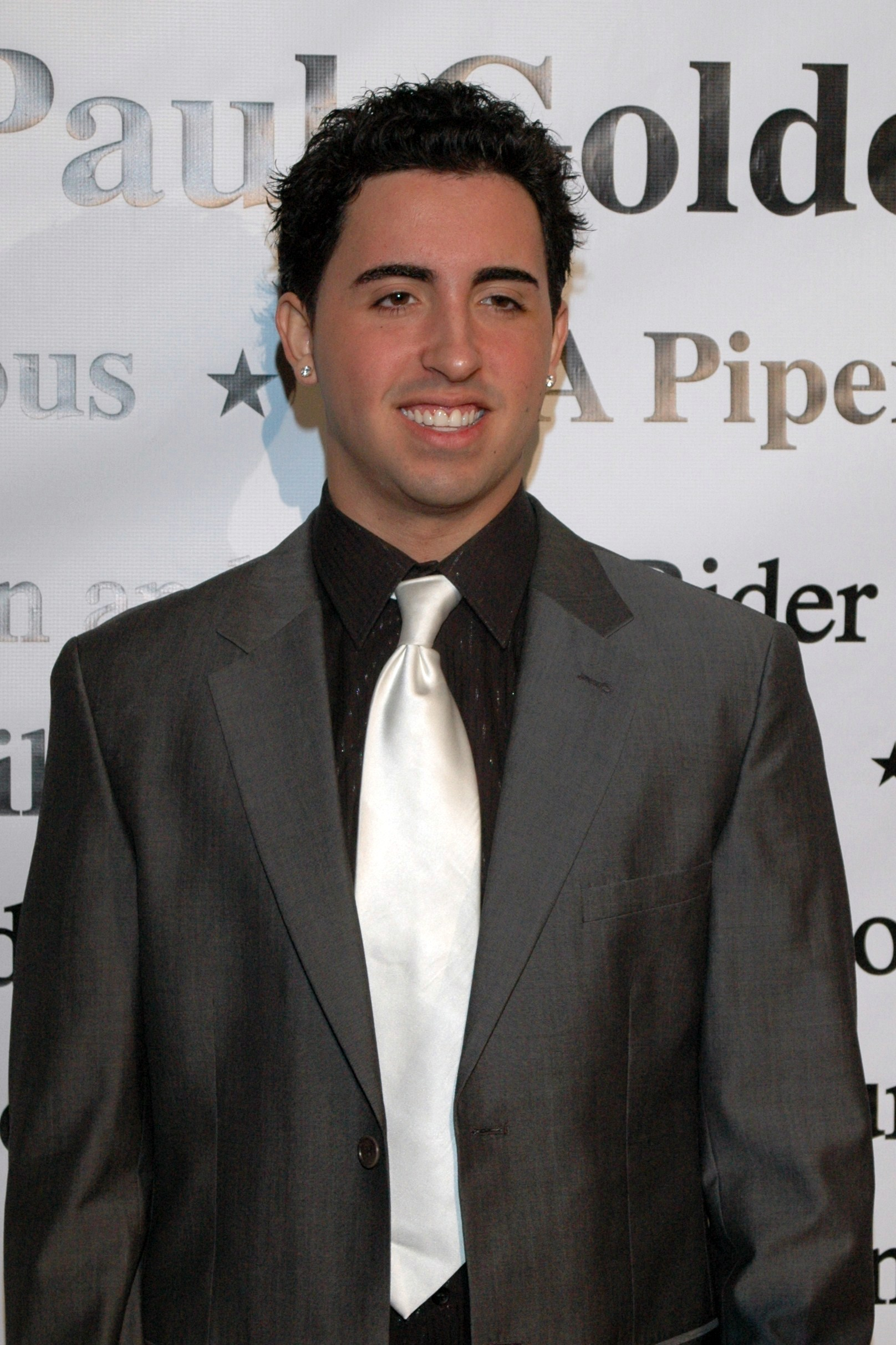
- O'Donis in 2009
- Studio albums: 1
- Singles: 16
- Music videos: 5

This is the discography of American R&B/hip hop singer Colby O'Donis. Signed to Kon Live Distribution, O'Donis has released one studio album and four solo singles. O'Donis was featured in Lady Gaga's No. 1 single "Just Dance" in 2008 off her debut album, The Fame. The single has been certified 11× Multi-Platinum by the Recording Industry Association of America.

O'Donis' debut single, "What You Got", featured pop singer Akon. The song was the lead-off single to O'Donis' debut album, Colby O. It was the first of three singles released from the album, however, it was the only one to chart, reaching the Top 20 of the Billboard Hot 100. Other singles released from the album were "Don't Turn Back" and "Let You Go". O'Donis' album reached a peak of No. 41 on the Billboard 200 and No. 14 on the Top R&B/Hip-Hop Albums charts.

== Studio albums ==
Year	Album details	Peak chart positions	
Year	Album details	US	US R&B
2008	Colby O: Release date: September 16, 2008; Label: Kon Live, Geffen	41	14

== Singles ==
=== As lead artist ===
List of singles as lead artist, with selected chart positions, showing year released and album name
Title	Year	Peak chart positions					Album
Title	Year	US	US R&B	US Pop	CAN	SWE	Album
"What You Got" (featuring Akon)	2008	14	84	8	29	59	Colby O
"Don't Turn Back"	2008	—	—	—	—	—	Colby O
"Let You Go"	2009	—	—	—	—	—	Colby O
"I Wanna Touch You"	2009	—	—	—	—	—	Non-album singles
"Texting Flirtation"	2010	—	—	—	—	—	Non-album singles
"Like Me"	2012	—	—	—	—	—	Non-album singles
"Lean"	2013	—	—	—	—	—	Non-album singles
"Turn This Night Around"	2013	—	—	—	—	—	Non-album singles
"Come Back"	2013	—	—	—	—	—	Non-album singles
"State of Mind"	2013	—	—	—	—	—	Non-album singles
"Kiss Those Lips"	2014	—	—	—	—	—	Non-album singles
"Going Down Tonight"	2015	—	—	—	—	—	Non-album singles
"Have Yourself A Merry Little Christmas"	2015	—	—	—	—	—	Non-album singles
"Hold On"	2020	—	—	—	—	—	Non-album singles
"Confidence"	2020	—	—	—	—	—	Non-album singles
"Don't Worry"	2021	—	—	—	—	—	Non-album singles
"Locked Up With You" (featuring Akon)	2025	—	—	—	—	—	TBA
"Pretty"	2026	—	—	—	—	—	TBA
"—" denotes a single that did not chart or was not released in that territory.

=== As featured artist ===
List of singles as featured artist, with selected chart positions and certifications, showing year released and album name
Title	Year	Peak chart positions						Certifications	Album
Title	Year	US	AUS	CAN	IRE	NL	UK	Certifications	Album
"Just Dance" (Lady Gaga featuring Colby O'Donis)	2008	1	1	1	1	1	1	RIAA: 11× Platinum; ARIA: 14× Platinum; BPI: 4× Platinum; MC: 10× Platinum	The Fame
"Beautiful" (Akon featuring Colby O'Donis and Kardinal Offishall)	2009	19	14	16	13	12	8	RIAA: 2× Platinum; ARIA: 3× Platinum	Freedom
"Hey Yo!" (Brooke Hogan featuring Colby O'Donis)	2009	—	—	—	—	—	—		The Redemption
"What You Waiting For" (Mizz Nina featuring Colby O'Donis)	2009	—	—	—	—	—	—		What You Waiting For
"Don't Worry" (BELARO featuring Colby O'Donis)	2021	—	—	—	—	—	—		Non-album singles
"—" denotes a single that did not chart or was not released in that territory.

== Production discography ==
=== 2007 ===
Colby O'Donis – Colby O

- 03. "She Wanna Go" (produced with Akon)
- 07. "Take You Away"
- 09. "Saved You Money"
- 11. "Tell Me This" (produced with Alex Teamer)
- 12. "Game For You" (produced with Kay-Ta Matsuno)

=== 2010 ===
Che'Nelle – Feel Good

- 11. "Razor"

=== 2011 ===
Jordan Knight – Unfinished

- 01. "Let's Go Higher"

== Music videos ==
=== Music videos ===
Song	Year	Director
"What You Got"	2008	Gil Green
"Don't Turn Back"	2008	Erik White
"Let You Go"	2009	Kel Mitchell
"I Wanna Touch You"	2009	Kel Mitchell
"Lean"	2013	Drew Kirsch

=== Featured music videos ===
Song	Year	Director
"Just Dance" (Lady Gaga featuring Colby O'Donis)	2008	Melina Matsoukas
"Beautiful" (Akon featuring Colby O'Donis & Kardinal Offishall)	2009	Gil Green
"Falling Down" (Space Cowboy featuring Chelsea Korka)	2009	Good Fellas
"What You Waiting For" (Mizz Nina featuring Colby O'Donis)	2010	
