= Robin Thicke production discography =

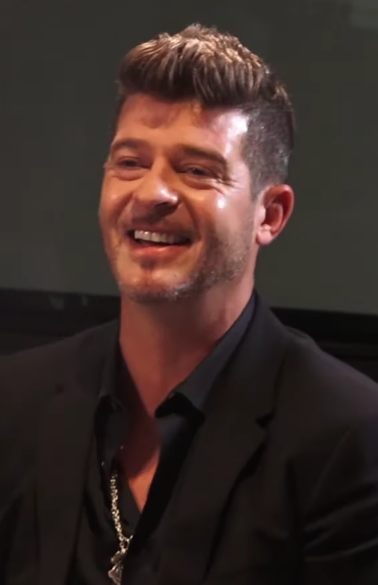
Thicke in 2019

The following is a discography of songs, recorded by various artists, that Robin Thicke has been credited for as a songwriter and producer.

== 1994 ==
=== Brandy - Brandy ===
- 12. "Love Is On My Side" (written with Damon Thomas; backing vocals)

== 1995 ==
=== 3T - Brotherhood ===
- 06. "Sexual Attention" (written with Damon Thomas)

=== Brian McKnight - I Remember You ===
- 05. "Anyway" (written with Brian McKnight)

=== U.N.V. - Universal Nubian Voices ===
- 09. "First Time" (written with Brian McKnight)

== 1996 ==
=== Color Me Badd - Now and Forever ===
- 01. "Sexual Capacity" (as Rob Thicke, written with Christopher A. Stewart, and Sean K. Hall; produced with Sean "Sep" Hall)

== 1997 ==
=== Brownstone - Still Climbing ===
- 08. "Around You" (writer; produced with Gerry Brown; backing vocals)

=== 98 Degrees - 98 Degrees ===
- 12. "Don't Stop the Love" (written with Christopher A. Stewart, Sean K. Hall)

=== Sam Salter - It's On Tonight ===
- 08. "Every Time A Car Drives By" (written with Phillip L. Stewart II)

== 1999 ==
=== Jordan Knight - Jordan Knight ===
- 01. "Give It to You" (written with James Harris III, Terry Lewis, Jordan Knight)
- 02. "A Different Party" (written with James Harris III, Terry Lewis, Jordan Knight)
- 03. "Change My Ways" (written with Bobby B. Keyes; Produced with Pro J & Jordan Knight)
- 04. "I Could Never Take the Place of Your Man" (Produced with Jordan Knight)
- 05. "Finally Finding Out" (written with Bobby B. Keyes, Armand Sabal-Lecco, and Jordan Knight; Produced with Jordan Knight)
- 07. "Don't Run" (written with Jordan Knight; Produced with Donnie Wahlberg and Jordan Knight)
- 08. "Separate Ways" (written with Alan Thicke, and Brennan Thicke; Produced with Jordan Knight)
- 09. "Close My Eyes" (written with James Harris III, Terry Lewis, Jordan Knight)
- 12. "Can I Come Over Tonight" (writer; Produced with Jordan Knight)

=== Christina Aguilera - Christina Aguilera ===
- 09. "When You Put Your Hands on Me" (written with James Gass a.k.a. Pro J; Produced with Pro J)

=== Chante Moore - This Moment Is Mine ===
- 13. "In My Life" (written with Lascelles Stephens; producer)

=== Marc Anthony - Marc Anthony ===
- 01. "When I Dream at Night" (written with Dan Shea)

=== Kevon Edmonds - 24/7 ===
- 05. "How Often" (written with Babyface, and Walter Afanasieff)

== 2000 ==
=== P!nk - Can't Take Me Home ===
- 06. "Let Me Let You Know" (written with Neal Creque, Sean Hall, and Christopher Stewart)

=== Mýa - Fear of Flying ===
- 10. "Takin' Me Over" (feat. Left Eye) (written with Mýa Harrison, Pro J, Lisa "Left Eye" Lopes, and Robert Daniels; produced with Pro J)
- 11. "Now or Never" (written with B.B. Keyes, Pro J (James Gass), and Robert Daniels; produced with Pro J)
- 15. "No Tears on My Pillow" (written with Mýa Harrison; produced with Pro J)

=== BBMak - Sooner or Later ===
- 06. "I Can Tell" (written and produced with Pro J)

=== Ronan Keating - Ronan ===
- 05. "Keep On Walking" (written with Ronan Keating and Patrick Leonard)

== 2001 ==
=== Mpress - Suddenly ===
- 01. "Maybe" (written with Tony Redic, Corron Cole, and Erica Dymakkus; produced with Corron Cole, and Steve "Rhythm" Clarke)
- 07. "Over Me" (written with Bobby Keyes, Pro J (James Gass), and Corron Cole; produced with Pro J and Corron Cole)

== 2002 ==
=== Prymary Colorz - If You Only Knew ===
- 03. "Say Goodbye" (written with Bobby Keyes, Corron Cole, Erica Dymakkus, James Gass, and Tony Redic)
- 09. "If I Could Change" (written with Dan Hill; co-produced with Pro-J and Corron Cole)

=== Ruff Endz - Someone To Love You ===
- 12. "You Mean The World to Me" (written with Corey Rooney, and Dan Shea)

== 2003 ==
=== Will Young - Friday's Child ===
- 07. "Very Kind" (written with Will Young, and Pro J (James Gass); Produced with Pro J)

== 2004 ==
=== Usher - Confessions ===
- 14. "Can U Handle It?" (writer; produced with Pro J)

=== Raven-Symoné - This Is My Time ===
- 05. "Set Me Free" (written with Pro J (James Gass), Raven-Symoné, Sean Hurley; produced with Pro J)

=== Guy Sebastian - Beautiful Life ===
- 01. "Out With My Baby" (written with Guy Sebastian and Pro J (James Gass); produced with Pro J)
- 09. "How" (writer; produced with Pro J)
- 12. "Fiend For You" (written with Guy Sebastian, Robert Daniels, and Pro J (James Gass); produced with Pro J)

=== Michael Jackson - The Ultimate Collection ===
- Disc 4, track 06. "Fall Again" (Demo)(previously unreleased) (written and produced with Walter Afanasieff)

== 2005 ==
=== Will Young - Keep On ===
- 09. "Madness" (written with Will Young, Pro J (James Gass), Sean Hurley; Produced with Pro J)

=== Lil Wayne - Tha Carter II ===
- 16. "Shooter" (feat. Robin Thicke)
  - Sample Credit: "Oh Shooter" by Robin Thicke
  - Sample Credit: "Mass Appeal" by Gang Starr

=== Darin - The Anthem ===
- 01. "Give It To Me" (written with Arnthor Birgisson)

== 2006 ==
=== Mary J. Blige - Mary J. Blige & Friends ===
- 02. "Ask Myself" (feat. Robin Thicke) (written with Bobby Keyes, Robert Daniels; Produced with Pro J)

=== Birdman & Lil Wayne - Like Father, Like Son ===
- 05. "Shooter" (feat. Robin Thicke) (Bonus Cd)
  - Sample Credit: "Oh Shooter" by Robin Thicke
  - Sample Credit: "Mass Appeal" by Gang Starr

== 2008 ==
=== Lil Wayne - Tha Carter III ===
- 08. "Tie My Hands" (feat. Robin Thicke) (written with Dwayne Carter; producer)

=== Jennifer Hudson - Jennifer Hudson ===
- 04. "Giving Myself" (writer; Produced with Pro J)
