= Jordan Knight (disambiguation) =

Jordan Knight (born 1970) is an American pop singer and songwriter.

Jordan Knight may refer to:

- Jordan Knight (soccer) (born 2003), Canadian soccer player
- Jordan Knight (album), 1999 album by Jordan Knight
- Jordan Knight Performs New Kids on the Block: The Remix Album, 2004 album by Jordan Knight

== See also ==
- Jordan Knight discography
- Jordan Knights FC, football club in Amman, Jordan
