= A Shoulder to Cry On =

A Shoulder to Cry On may refer to:

- A Shoulder to Cry On (TV series)
- "A Shoulder to Cry On" (Charley Pride song)
- "A Shoulder to Cry On" (Tommy Page song)
