= Paintings in My Mind =

Studio album by Tommy Page
- Released: April 25, 1990
- Recorded: 1989–1990
- Studio: Mission Control Studios (Boston, Massachusetts); Greene St. Recording, Z Studios, Sorcerer Sound, Prime Cuts, Right Track Recording, Axis Studios, Soundtrack Studios and Electric Lady Studios (New York City, New York); Normandy Sound (Warren, Rhode Island); Zebra Studio (Studio City, California); Conway Studios (Hollywood, California); Devonshire Sound Studios (North Hollywood, California); Westlake Studios (Los Angeles, California)
- Genre: Pop; dance-pop; pop rock
- Length: 40:41
- Label: Sire/Warner Bros.
- Producer: Tommy Page; Michael Jonzun; Mark Kamins; Jordan Knight; Jeremy Lubbock; Arif Mardin; Joe Mardin; Donnie Wahlberg; Randy Waldman; Fred Zarr

Tommy Page chronology
Republic of Idols (1989)	Paintings in My Mind (1990)	From the Heart (1991)

Singles from Paintings in My Mind
- 1. "I'll Be Your Everything" Released: January 31, 1990; 2. "Turn on the Radio" Released: September 10, 1990; 3. "When I Dream of You" Released: 1990

Professional ratings
Review scores
Source	Rating
Allmusic	4/5 stars

Paintings in My Mind is the second studio album by American singer-songwriter Tommy Page. Released by Sire Records and Warner Bros. Records on April 25, 1990, it features the single "I'll Be Your Everything" which became his only number one single on the Billboard Hot 100. The track was co-written by New Kids on the Block member Jordan Knight. The second single "Turn on the Radio" did not enter the chart while "When I Dream of You" became a number-42 hit. Another New Kids on the Block member, Donnie Wahlberg, contributed to the writing of the song "Turn on the Radio". The album also features a duet with singer Sa-Fire on the song "Don't Give Up on Love."

== Track listing ==
All tracks are written by Tommy Page, except where noted.

Side A
No.	Title	Writer(s)	Producer(s)	Length
1.	"I'll Be Your Everything"	Page; Jordan Knight; Danny Wood	Donnie Wahlberg; Knight; Michael Jonzun	4:08
2.	"I Break Down"		Joe Mardin; Page	3:46
3.	"Turn on the Radio"	Page; Knight; Wahlberg	Wahlberg; Knight; Jonzun	4:03
4.	"Don't Give Up on Love" (Duet with Sa-Fire)	Page; Wilma Cosmé; L. Russell Brown	Fred Zarr	3:54
5.	"When I Dream of You"		Arif Mardin	4:07

Side B
No.	Title	Writer(s)	Producer(s)	Length
1.	"Till the End of Time"	Page; Brown	Zarr	5:09
2.	"Just Before (I Was Gonna Say I Love You)"		Zarr	3:44
3.	"Don't Walk Away"	Page; Brown	Mark Kamins	3:34
4.	"You're the Best Thing (That Ever Happened to Me)"		Page	4:05
5.	"Paintings in My Mind"		Jeremy Lubbock	4:05

== Personnel ==
- Tommy Page – vocals, arrangements (1–5, 7–9), backing vocals (4, 5, 8)
- Jordan Knight – keyboards (1, 3), arrangements (1, 3), backing vocals (1, 3)
- Joe Mardin – keyboard programming (2), drum programming (2), backing vocals (2), arrangements (2)
- Fred Zarr – keyboards (4, 6, 7), arrangements (4, 6, 7)
- Dave Lebolt – keyboard programming (5), drum programming (5), arrangements (5)
- Eric Kupper – keyboards (8), arrangements (8)
- Art Labriola – keyboards (9), acoustic piano (9), arrangements (9)
- Jeremy Lubbock – keyboards (10), arrangements (10)
- Randy Waldman – keyboards (10)
- Bobby Keyes – guitars (1, 3)
- Maurice Starr – guitars (1), bass guitar (1)
- John McCurry – guitars (2, 5)
- Ira Siegel – guitars (4, 6, 7, 9)
- Kevin Clark – guitars (10)
- Donnie Wahlberg – drums (1, 3), backing vocals (1, 3), arrangements (3)
- Bashiri Johnson – percussion (6, 7)
- Bob Gay – saxophone (1, 3)
- Ole Mathisen – saxophones (3)
- Ed Palmero – saxophone (6, 7)
- Andy Snitzer – saxophone (9)
- Jeff Galindo – trombone (3)
- Walter Platt – trumpet (3)
- Miguel Sá Pessoa – string arrangements (1)
- Arif Mardin – arrangements (5)
- Bruce Dukov – concertmaster (10)
- Michael Jonzun – backing vocals (1, 3), arrangements (1, 3), keyboards (3), horn arrangements (3)
- Danny Wood – backing vocals (1, 3)
- Sa-Fire – vocals (4), backing vocals (4)
- Carrie Johnson – backing vocals (4, 7–9)
- Libby Johnson – backing vocals (4, 8, 9)
- Angela Cappelli – backing vocals (5)
- Rachele Cappelli – backing vocals (5)
- Lani Groves – backing vocals (5)
- Peter Lord – backing vocals (6)
- V. Jeffrey Smith – backing vocals (6)
- Sandra St. Victor – backing vocals (6)

=== Production ===
- Vicky Germaise – session coordinator (2, 5)
- Barry Marshall – session coordinator (3)
- Dick Scott – session coordinator (3)
- Abbe Rosenfeld – session coordinator (4, 6, 7)
- Mary Ann Dibs – art direction, design
- Mark Abrahams – photography
- Elizabeth Gadbois – hand tinting

Technical

- Bernie Grundman – mastering at Bernie Grundman Mastering (Hollywood, California)
- Miguel Sá Pessoa – engineer (1, 3)
- Phil Greene – mixing (1, 3, 9)
- Joe Mardin – engineer (2), mixing (2, 5)
- Nick Sansano – engineer (2, 5)
- Rod Hui – mixing (2, 5)
- Bill Esses – engineer (4, 6, 7, 9)
- Phil Castellano – mixing (4, 6, 7)
- Fred Zarr – mixing (4)
- David Sussman – engineer (8)
- Hugo Dwyer – mixing (8)
- Kevin Clark – engineer (10), mixing (10)
- Jim Jackson – assistant engineer (1, 3, 9)
- Marcus Rapagnola – assistant engineer (1, 3)
- Dan Wood – assistant engineer (2, 5)
- Matt Malles – assistant engineer (4, 6, 7)
- Jim Goatley – assistant engineer (6, 7)
- Donald Guillaume – assistant engineer (6, 7)
- John Herman – assistant engineer (8)
- Dave Liebowitz – assistant engineer (9)
- John Parthum – assistant engineer (9)

== Reception ==
In his AllMusic review, Peter Fawthrop called the album a fresh, innocent album full of youthful longing and said that it was top fare for the teen pop crowd.

== Release history ==
Country	Date	Label
Canada	1990	Sire/Warner Bros. Records
Japan	1990	Sire/Warner Bros. Records
Germany	1990	Sire/Warner Bros. Records
United States	1990	Sire/Warner Bros. Records
Greece	1990	Sire/Warner Bros. Records
