= I Wanna Touch You =

I Wanna Touch You may refer to:

- I Wanna Touch You (album), a 2008 album by Merzedes Club, and the title song
- I Wanna Touch You (Ultrabeat song)
- I Wanna Touch You (Colby O'Donis song)
