= Let's Go Higher =

Let's Go Higher may refer to:

- "Let's Go Higher" (Johnny Reid song), 2010
- "Let's Go Higher" (Jordan Knight song), 2011
