= Just Dance (song) =

Single by Lady Gaga featuring Colby O'Donis

from the album The Fame
- B-side: "Just Dance (HHCR’s bambossa main mix)"
- Released: April 8, 2008
- Recorded: January 2008
- Studio: Record Plant Studios (Hollywood)
- Genre: Electropop; synth-pop; dance-pop
- Length: 4:01
- Label: Streamline; KonLive; Cherrytree; Interscope
- Songwriters: Lady Gaga; RedOne; Aliaune Thiam
- Producer: RedOne

Lady Gaga singles chronology
"Just Dance" (2008)	"Poker Face" (2008)

Colby O'Donis singles chronology
"What You Got" (2008)	"Just Dance" (2008)	"Don't Turn Back" (2008)

Music video
- "Just Dance" on YouTube

"Just Dance" is the debut single by the American singer Lady Gaga. It was released on April 8, 2008, as the lead single from Gaga's debut studio album, The Fame (2008), through Streamline Records, KonLive, Cherrytree Records, and Interscope Records. The song features additional vocals from fellow American singer Colby O'Donis, and was written in 2008 by Gaga herself, alongside its producer RedOne and American singer Akon. It was also recorded at Record Plant Studios, based in Hollywood, Los Angeles. A dance-pop song with elements of electropop and synth-pop, the track lyrically speaks about being intoxicated and partying at a nightclub, and was written by Gaga in 10 minutes as "a happy record", evident through the chorus of "just dance, gonna be okay".

"Just Dance" received acclaim from music critics, who complimented its club anthem-like nature and the sound associated with it. The song was a sleeper hit, spending almost five months on the Billboard Hot 100 before finally reaching number 1 in January 2009. It is certified eleven times Platinum by the Recording Industry Association of America (RIAA), fourteen times Platinum in Australia, and Diamond in Canada. Outside of the United States, "Just Dance" topped the charts in Australia, Canada, Greece, Ireland, the Netherlands, and the United Kingdom, as well as the top ten of the charts in the Czech Republic, Denmark, Germany, Hungary, Israel, New Zealand, Norway, Spain, and Sweden. It was the third-best-selling single of 2009 in the US and the UK. The track is among the best-selling digital singles of all time, having sold over 10 million copies.

Its music video portrays Gaga appearing at a party where she plays the song, prompting party-goers to start dancing in enjoyment. Gaga compared her experience of shooting the video to being on a Martin Scorsese movie set. "Just Dance" was performed by her in several live appearances such as the Miss Universe 2008, So You Think You Can Dance, The Tonight Show with Jay Leno, all of her concert tours, and the Super Bowl LI halftime show. She usually plays on a keytar while performing the song. At the 51st Grammy Awards, "Just Dance" was nominated in the Best Dance Recording category—Gaga's first Grammy nomination—although it would lose to Daft Punk's Alive 2007 recording of "Harder, Better, Faster, Stronger".

== Writing and inspiration ==
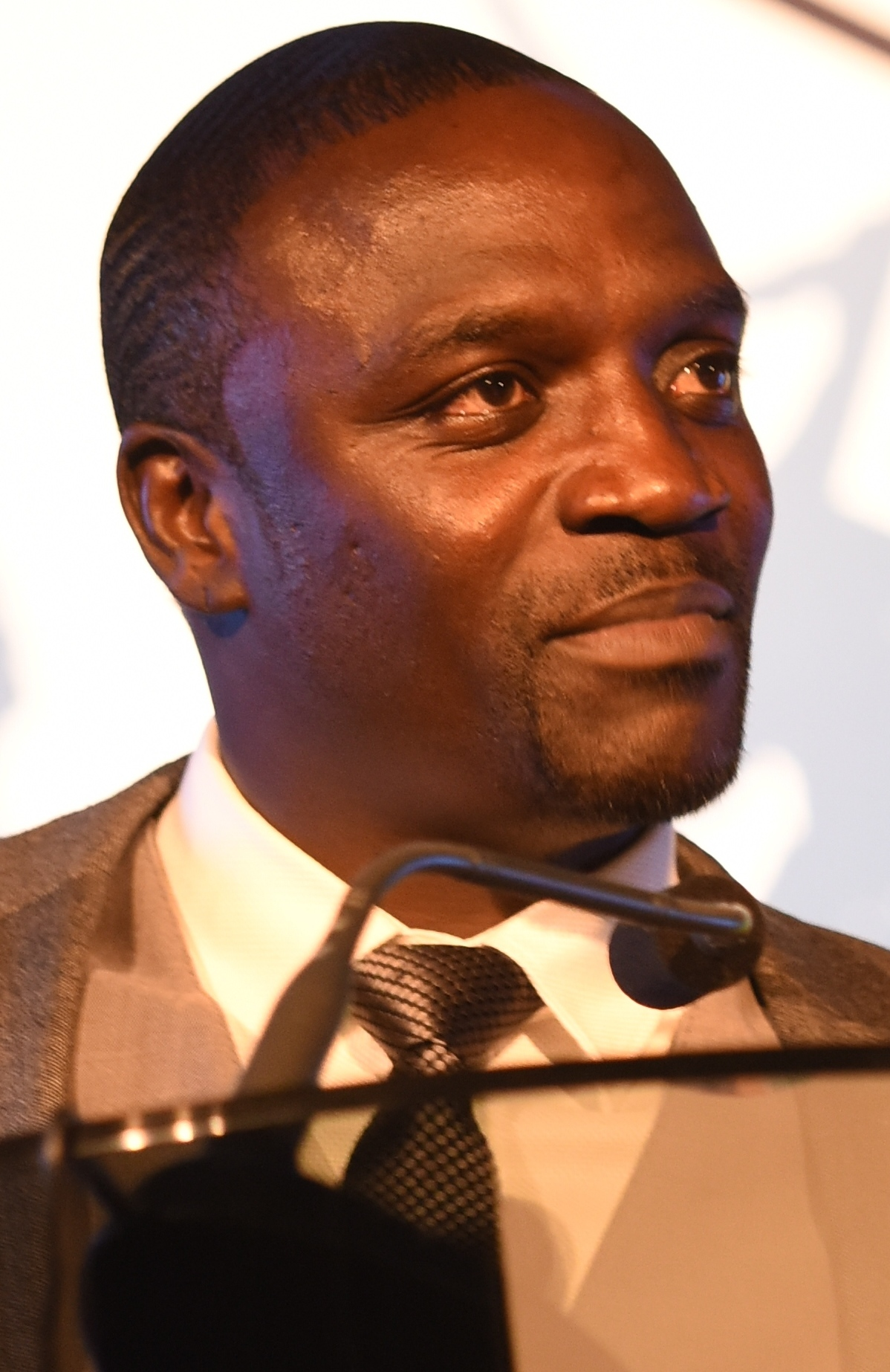
Singer Akon co-wrote "Just Dance" with Gaga and the song's producer RedOne.

"Just Dance" was written by Lady Gaga and Akon with co-writing by RedOne, who also produced the track. In an interview with Heat, Gaga explained her inspiration for writing the song. She said, "I was very hungover. I wrote the song in about 10 minutes with [producer] RedOne. And it was my first time being in a Hollywood studio. Very pristine, big, huge room with giant speakers." Gaga wrote "Just Dance" during 2008 and according to her it was "hard work and a lot of people didn't believe in it at first". Later, Gaga reflected on the song by saying,

"That record saved my life. I was in such a dark space in New York. I was so depressed, always in a bar. I got on a plane to LA to do my music and was given one shot to write the song that would change my life, and I did. I never went back. I left behind my boyfriend, my apartment. I still haven't been back. My mother went in and cleared it for me."

Gaga also explained that "Just Dance" is a happy record and is supposed to be appreciated by people going through rough times, like losing jobs and homes. Gaga further explained with Artistdirect that she wanted to write a beautiful record with "Just Dance". Being asked the reason for which "Just Dance" has become popular, Gaga said that she thought, "Everyone is looking for a song that really speaks to the joy in our souls and in our hearts and having a good time. It's just one of those records. It feels really good, and when you listen to it, it makes you feel good inside. It's as simple as that. I don't think it's rocket science when it comes to the heart. I think it's a heart theme song."

Akon said in 2018 that he was originally the featured artist on the song, and the version with him was the one originally sent to radio stations. However, Interscope's parent company Universal Music Group blocked him from being featured on the record, leading to the single being quickly recalled and replaced with a new version featuring Akon's protégé Colby O'Donis singing his verse instead. Akon's backing vocals were retained on this final version. In March 2017, Kimberly Wyatt from the Pussycat Dolls said that "Just Dance" was originally written as a demo for the group. Their team passed on the song, and Gaga decided to record it herself. In a 2025 interview about her album Mayhem, Gaga revealed that she feels anxious about her "super pop" songs, confessing that she nearly cut "How Bad Do U Want Me" from the album—just as she almost left off "Just Dance" from The Fame for the same reason.

== Composition ==
"Just Dance"
A 24-second sample of Gaga's "Just Dance" featuring the chorus sung by Gaga in the range of C♯_{3} to B_{4} backed by a marching synth beat.

"Just Dance" is an uptempo electropop, synth-pop and dance-pop song, combining synths of clipped marching beats with soaring electronics. It is written in the key of C♯ minor and is set at a moderate dance tempo of 119 beats per minute. Gaga's vocal spans from the low note of G♯_{3} to the high note of C♯_{5}. The song begins with a fast tempo followed by the synth arrangement and Gaga uttering "RedOne", followed by "Konvict" and "Gaga". "Just Dance" has a basic progression of C♯m–E–B–F♯m. O'Donis sings the interlude in the same range as Gaga followed by an R&B-influenced interlude by her, after which the chorus is repeated with O'Donis providing backup vocals and the marching beats. The song ends with an echoing of the word "dance".

Lyrically, "Just Dance" throws a partial tongue-in-cheek perspective with lyrics like "What's going on on the floor? / I love this record, baby, but I can't see straight anymore". The lyrics deal with being completely intoxicated at a party. The opening lyric "RedOne" has often been misinterpreted as "red wine", but in actuality is a reference to music producer RedOne.

== Critical reception ==
Matthew Chisling of AllMusic described the song as "a powerhouse of dance waves and infectiously produced beats". Alexis Petridis of The Guardian called it a "beguilingly compulsive tale of pulling a drug-induced whitey, with a combination of clipped marching beats, sawing electronics and mild R&B flavor that bears a vague resemblance to Nelly Furtado's 'Maneater'". Ben Norman of About.com said that the song "opens the album like a valkyrie leading the charge [...] riding triumphant ahead of her army". However, he also noted that the song is not groundbreaking and compared it to the music of Rihanna, Chris Brown, and the Pussycat Dolls. Bill Lamb from About.com called the song tame, but catchy enough for Gaga to be noticed in the mainstream. He also added that "'Just Dance' has strong energy and features Lady Gaga's striking voice, but it ultimately adds up to rather bland dance-pop". O'Donis' smooth vocals were also complemented.

Evan Sawdey of PopMatters said that "Just Dance" is an intensely catchy single and is an excellent indicator of what the album was about. Ben Hogwood of MusicOMH praised the song saying, "You won't get many more catchy party odes than the chart topping Just Dance this year, a polished gem set to lodge in your head for the next few weeks". J. Freedom du Lac of The Washington Post described the song to be "filled with mindlessly frothy synth-pop that matches low-grade dance grooves with GaGa's icy, almost disembodied vocals about dancing bliss". Lynn Saxberg from the Ottawa Citizen, while reviewing Gaga's The Fame Ball Tour, called the song a perfect sing-along club anthem. Sal Cinquemani from Slant Magazine wrote that the song resembles the "desperate train wreck you're likely to encounter getting wasted at any dive on the L.E.S. at four in the morning" as is emphasized by the lyrics. Talia Kranes from BBC called the song irresistible and said that "the catchiness of her songs is sure to cement her place in the list of pop idols".

At the 51st Grammy Awards, "Just Dance" was nominated for a Grammy Award for Best Dance Recording, but it lost to electronic duo Daft Punk for their song "Harder, Better, Faster, Stronger (Alive 2007)". It became Gaga's first Grammy nomination.

== Chart performance ==
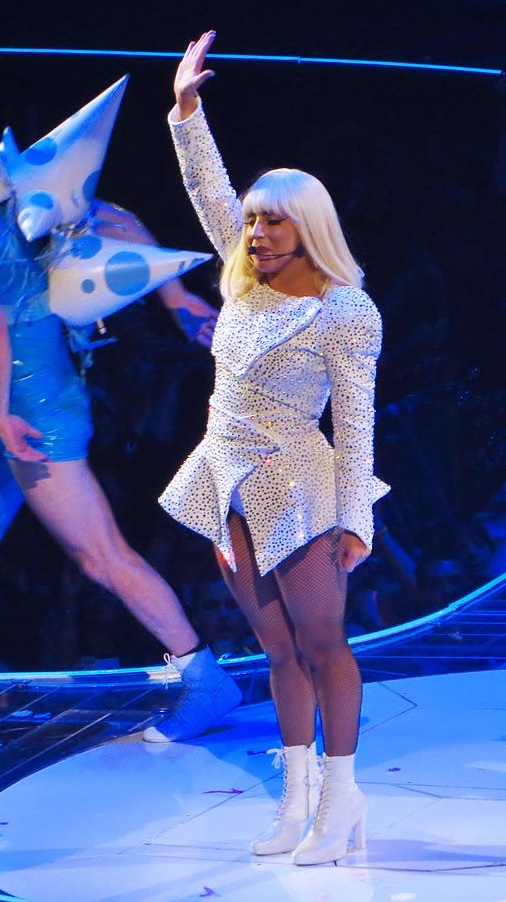
Gaga performing "Just Dance" on the ArtRave: The Artpop Ball tour (2014)

In the United States, "Just Dance" was initially a club hit following its release, peaking at number 2 on both the Hot Dance Airplay and Hot Dance Club Play charts during the summer of 2008. The song entered the Billboard Hot 100 chart at number 76 on August 16, 2008. After five months, it gradually rose to number 2 on the Hot 100, after selling 419,000 downloads on January 10, 2009. The next week, the song reached number 1 on the Hot 100. The single took a total of twenty-two weeks to hit the top spot, which is the longest climb to number 1 since Creed's "With Arms Wide Open" in 2000. The song also reached the top of the Mainstream Top 40 chart, becoming Gaga's first number 1 song. "Just Dance" spent a total of forty-nine weeks on the Hot 100 and on April 12, 2023, the single was certified eleven times Platinum by the Recording Industry Association of America (RIAA) for shipment of eleven million copies. It was the second song to reach the six-million mark in paid downloads, following "I Gotta Feeling" by The Black Eyed Peas. As of February 2018, "Just Dance" had sold 7.2 million digital downloads in the United States. In Canada, the song debuted at number 97 on the Canadian Hot 100 for the issue dated June 7, 2008. It reached the top of the chart on August 23, 2008, and was present there for five consecutive weeks. The song was later certified Diamond by Music Canada for sales of 800,000 copies.

The track debuted at number 34 on the ARIA Singles Chart on July 21, 2008, and moved up to number 17 the next week. On September 15, 2008, the track reached the top of the chart. "Just Dance" was certified fourteen times Platinum by the Australian Recording Industry Association (ARIA) for sales of 980,000 equivalent units. The song was credited as the longest charting single in ARIA history, spending over eighty-one weeks in the Top 100. "Just Dance" debuted on the New Zealand charts at number 19, and reached a peak of number 3. It has been certified quadruple Platinum by Recorded Music NZ (RMNZ) for sales of 120,000 equivalent units.

In the United Kingdom, "Just Dance" debuted at number 3 on the UK Singles Chart on January 4, 2009. It rose to number 1 the next week with total sales of 65,764 copies, and remained at the top for three weeks. Gaga explained her feelings on reaching number 1 in the United Kingdom saying, "It's been a long running dream to have a big hit in the UK – my fans there are so sexy and the people are so innovative and free in how they think about pop culture and music. I was in my apartment in Los Angeles getting ready to go to dance rehearsal when they called and told me, and I just cried." In July 2016, it became Gaga's third song to pass one million combined sales in the United Kingdom based on streaming. By January 2017, it had been streamed 6.3 million times in the nation according to the Official Charts Company, and by May 2020, the song had sold 968,000 copies. The song was declared Gaga's fourth most popular track in the UK in February 2025, having amassed a total of 2.1 million chart units sold, with 197 million streams. Later that same year, Just Dance was certified quadruple Platinum by the British Phonographic Industry (BPI) for sales of 2.4 million units.

In Ireland, the song debuted at number 11, and after one week, it peaked atop the chart. The song also topped the Dutch Top 40 on February 28, 2009. Across Europe, "Just Dance" reached the top ten in Austria, Denmark, Finland, Germany, Norway, Sweden, Switzerland, and the top twenty in Belgium (Flanders and Wallonia) and France. Worldwide, the song has sold over 10 million digital copies.

== Music video ==
Released on April 25, 2008, the video was directed by music video director Melina Matsoukas, and is based on the song's thematic content of being at a party. The video begins with Gaga arriving with her background dancers at a house party, which seems to have ended. One of the dancers puts a Discolite boombox on, blaring the music through the house. The crowd at the party appear to be sleeping in different areas, and are awoken by the music. They all start to dance, and scenes of the party are intercut with scenes of a scantily clad Gaga dancing in a poncho, with a disco ball or in a small kiddie pool playing with an inflated orca whale. She wears a blue, lightning-bolt-shaped sticker beneath her right eye like that on the single cover, which paid tribute to the album cover of David Bowie's Aladdin Sane, as he is one of her musical idols. O'Donis appears in the video being flanked by several girls during the "when I come through on the dance floor" interlude. Cameo appearances are made by Akon and Space Cowboy. MTV called the video an ode to the "Me Decade". During an interview with Australian radio in September 2008, Gaga said that "[t]he whole video is performance art about being drunk at a party." When asked about the shooting experience of the music video, Gaga explained,

"Oh, it was so fun, it was amazing. For me, it was like being on a Martin Scorsese set. I've been so low-budget for so long, and to have this incredibly amazing video was really very humbling. It was really fun, but you'll see if you ever come to a video shoot of mine one day – I'm very private about those things, I don't really talk to everybody. I'm not like the party girl running around. I might even seem to be a bit of a diva. I'm sort of with myself, in my work headspace, worrying about costumes, and if extras look right, and placement. I don't just show up for things, you know. That video was a vision of mine. It was Melina, the director, who wanted to do something, to have a performance art aspect that was so pop, but it was still commercial, and that felt like lifestyle. It was all those things, I love it."

The official video on Lady Gaga's Vevo channel, LadyGagaVevo, was a favorite among fans on and around December 8, 2009, the day Vevo was launched. In a 2025 retrospective on Gaga’s evolving fashion, Entertainment Weekly's Mary Sollosi wrote that the music video continued her "DIY-disco look", noting the return of the homemade mirror-ball bra she had previously worn at Lollapalooza in 2007, before rising to major fame.

== Live performances ==
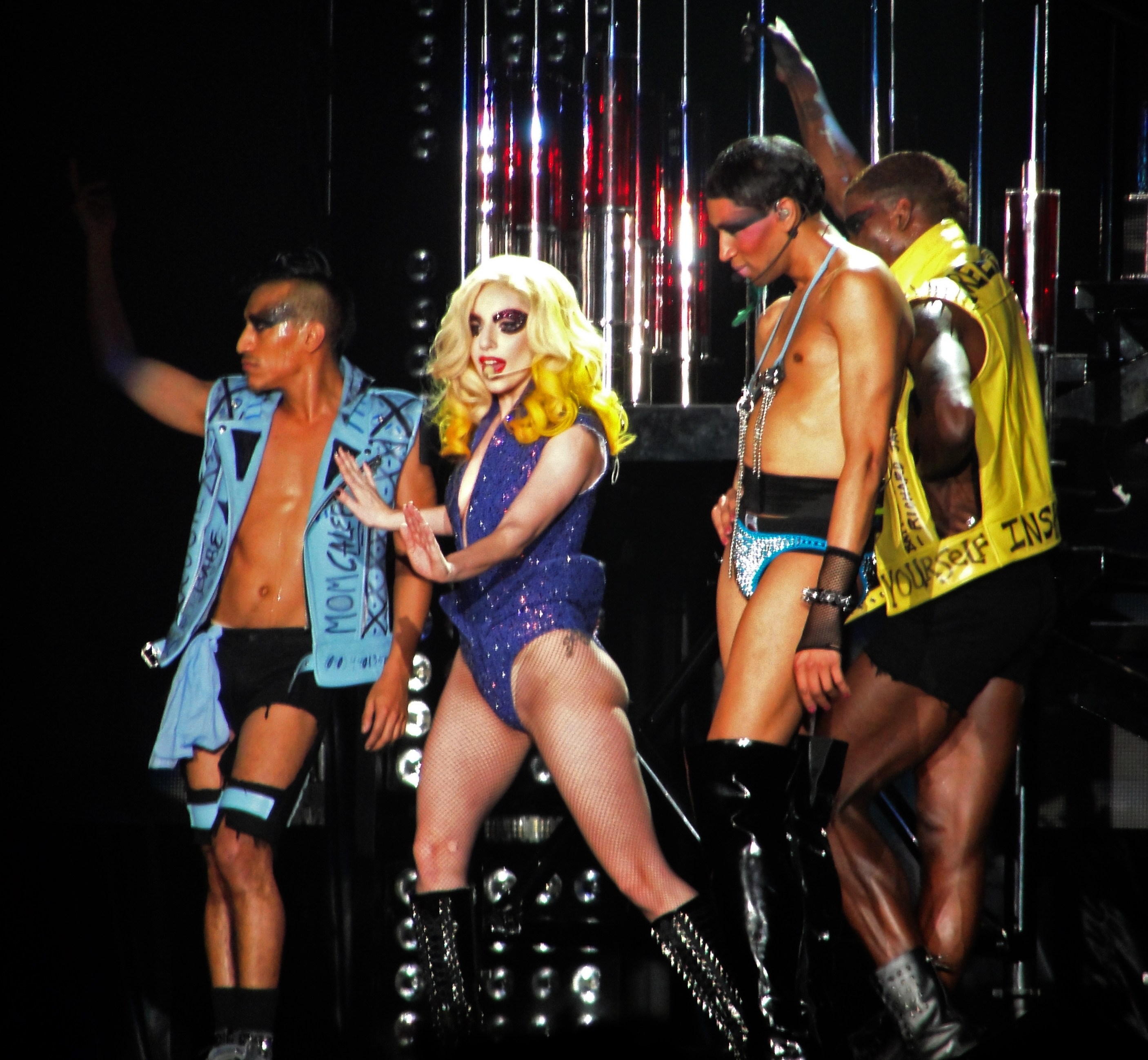
Gaga performing "Just Dance" during the revamped Monster Ball concert series, in 2010

In July, she performed the song for the first time at the swimsuit competition of the Miss Universe 2008 in Vietnam. Later, Lady Gaga performed the song on many television shows in the United States. She appeared on Jimmy Kimmel Live!, The Tonight Show with Jay Leno, So You Think You Can Dance and The Ellen DeGeneres Show. In Australia, she performed on Sunrise, where her performance was condemned for lip-synching. Gaga denied it and released a statement saying, "I was sick the day of the show, but I absolutely, 100 per cent, was singing live. [...] have never lip-synched and never will. Even on my worst day, I never will." In the United Kingdom, she performed the song on GMTV. She also performed the single during her AOL sessions.

"Just Dance" was added to the setlist of her first headlining The Fame Ball Tour, where it was performed before the encore. As the performance for the acoustic version of "Poker Face" ended, Gaga exited from the stage, and a video interlude called "The Face" started, telling about Gaga's alternate persona, Candy Warhol, and teaching her to speak. Gaga appeared on the stage wearing a tutu shaped dress with pointed shoulderpads and peplum. Her dancers were clad in Louis Vuitton Steven Sprouse printed trousers which matched Gaga's shoes. The backdrop changed to show blinking disco lights and Gaga stood wearing her video sunglasses, displaying the line "Pop Music Will Never Be Low Brow". A remix of the intro for "Just Dance" started and Gaga started singing the song, while moving around in choreographed dance moves.

The song was also added to the setlist of The Monster Ball Tour. During the original version of the tour, she performed it as the second song. After the opening song "Dance in the Dark", she strapped on a portable silver jewelled keyboard and started performing "Just Dance" while inside a white cube from which she emerged at the top, and the video screen came up. She was raised on a platform with a keytar over her shoulder as eight dancers in white bodysuits locked into steps below her. For the revamped Monster Ball shows, in 2010–11, Gaga wore a futuristic "glitter ball suit", and started the performance by playing on a keyboard hidden inside the hood of a Rolls-Royce. In May 2011, Gaga performed the song during Radio 1's Big Weekend in Carlisle, Cumbria.

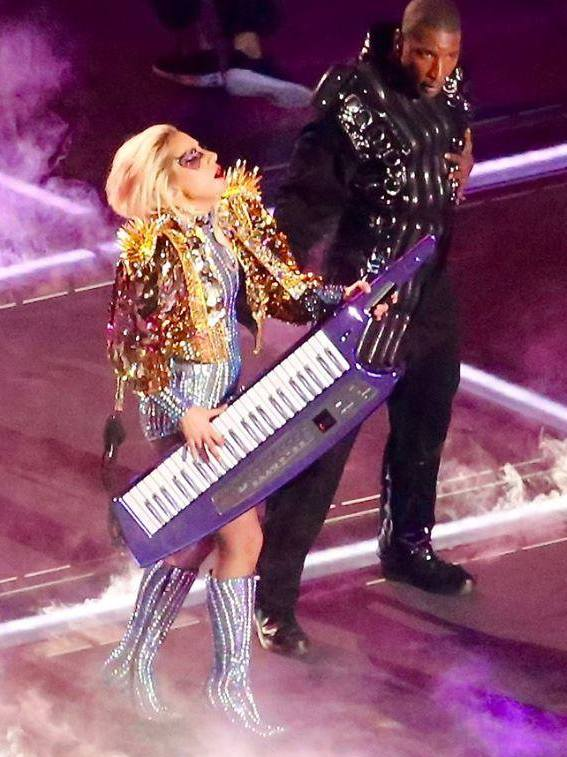
Gaga performing the song at the Super Bowl LI halftime show. During the live performances of "Just Dance", she is often seen playing a keytar.

"Just Dance" was included on her third concert tour, the Born This Way Ball (2012–2013), where Gaga performed it on the extended stage walkway and shouted off to her fans for joining and dancing onstage. Emily Zemler from The Hollywood Reporter noted that "For all her preconceived speeches, these genuine moments resonated deeply with the audience, most of whom were dressed in tribute to the singer." In 2014, Gaga performed the song during her residency show at Roseland Ballroom, while wearing a yellow outfit. For her worldwide tour, ArtRave: The Artpop Ball, Gaga combined "Just Dance" with short performances of "Poker Face" and "Telephone". While she danced and sang the songs, the backdrops displayed multiple images of Gaga writhing around, while wrapped in tinsel and moss. During "Just Dance", she strapped on a seahorse-shaped keytar. Melissa Ruggieri from The Atlanta Journal-Constitution was impressed with Gaga's vocals and complimented her for performing "old songs" in her actual voice.

On February 5, 2017, Gaga performed "Just Dance" during the Super Bowl LI halftime show. She was wearing a spicy gold jacket and played on a keytar, while one of her dancers held the microphone for her. In the same year, the song was added to the setlist of Gaga's two shows at the Coachella Festival, where she was one of the headliners. On the Joanne World Tour (2017–2018), Gaga wore a pearl-encrusted pale blue bodysuit with dramatic shoulder pads, and knee-high lace-up boots while performing the track. "Just Dance" served as the opening song of the singer's Las Vegas residency, Enigma (2018–2020). During the performance, Gaga descends from the ceiling in a harness and a sequined jumpsuit while playing on a keytar. "Just Dance" received further performances on the concert tours, The Chromatica Ball (2022), and The Mayhem Ball (2025–2026).

== In other media ==
"Just Dance" was featured in an episode of The Office by the name of "Michael Scott Paper Company", in which Steve Carell's character mistakes it for a Britney Spears song.

The song shares the title with the rhythm game series Just Dance. The track eventually made an appearance in the series in Just Dance 2014. Other music-based video games that feature the song include Rock Band (2010), Dance Central (2010), and the virtual reality game Beat Saber (2021).

== Track listings and formats ==
- U.S./Japanese CD single
1. "Just Dance" – 4:02
2. "Just Dance" (Harry 'Choo Choo' Romero's Bambossa Main Mix) – 7:12
3. "Just Dance" (Richard Vission Remix) – 6:13
4. "Just Dance" (Trevor Simpson Remix) – 7:20
- Australian/German CD single
1. "Just Dance" – 4:02
2. "Just Dance" (Trevor Simpson Remix) – 7:21
- German CD maxi single
1. "Just Dance" – 4:02
2. "Just Dance" (Harry 'Choo Choo' Romero's Bambossa Main Mix) – 7:14
3. "Just Dance" (Instrumental Version) – 4:00
4. "Just Dance" (Video) – 4:10
- French CD maxi single
1. "Just Dance" – 4:02
2. "Just Dance" (Glam As You Radio Mix By Guéna LG) – 3:39
3. "Just Dance" (Glam As You Club Mix By Guéna LG) – 6:25
- US iTunes Remixes EP
1. "Just Dance" – 4:02
2. "Just Dance" (Harry 'Choo Choo' Romero's Bambossa Main Mix) – 7:12
3. "Just Dance" (Richard Vission Remix) – 6:13
4. "Just Dance" (Trevor Simpson Remix) – 7:20
- US iTunes Remixes Pt. 2 EP
1. "Just Dance" (RedOne Remix) [feat. Kardinal Offishall] – 4:18
2. "Just Dance" (Space Cowboy Remix) [feat. Colby O'Donis] – 5:01
3. "Just Dance" (Robots To Mars Remix) – 4:37
4. "Just Dance" (Tony Arzadon Remix) [feat. Colby O'Donis] – 6:24
- UK EP
1. "Just Dance" – 4:02
2. "Just Dance" (Remix) [featuring Kardinal Offishall] – 4:18
3. "Just Dance" (Glam As You Mix By Guéna LG) – 6:25
4. "Just Dance" (Music Video) – 4:06
- UK 7" numbered picture vinyl disc
1. "Just Dance" (Main Version) – 4:04
2. "Just Dance" (Harry 'Choo Choo' Romero's Bambossa Main Mix) – 7:12

== Credits and personnel ==
Credits adapted from the liner notes of The Fame.

- Lady Gaga – lead vocals, songwriting, background vocals
- RedOne – songwriting, production, background vocals, instrumentation, music programming, recording at Record Plant Studios, Hollywood, Los Angeles, California
- Akon – songwriting, background vocals
- Colby O'Donis – additional lead vocals, background vocals
- Dave Russel – audio engineering
- Robert Orton – audio mixing
- Gene Grimaldi – audio mastering at Oasis Mastering, Burbank, California

== Charts ==
=== Weekly charts ===
Weekly chart performance
Chart (2008–2009)	Peak position
Australia (ARIA)	1
Austria (Ö3 Austria Top 40)	8
Belgium (Ultratop 50 Flanders)	13
Belgium (Ultratop 50 Wallonia)	15
Croatia International Airplay (HRT)	2
Czech Republic Airplay (ČNS IFPI)	5
Canada Hot 100 (Billboard)	1
Canada CHR/Top 40 (Billboard)	1
Canada Hot AC (Billboard)	2
CIS Airplay (TopHit)	8
Denmark (Tracklisten)	6
Europe (European Hot 100 Singles)	3
Finland (Suomen virallinen lista)	7
France (SNEP)	14
Germany (GfK)	10
Greece Digital Song Sales (Billboard)	1
Hungary (Dance Top 40)	7
Hungary (Rádiós Top 40)	2
Hungary (Single Top 40)	5
Ireland (IRMA)	1
Israel (Media Forest)	10
Italy (FIMI)	36
Japan Hot 100 (Billboard)	2
Mexico (Billboard Mexican Airplay)	30
Netherlands (Dutch Top 40)	1
Netherlands (Single Top 100)	4
New Zealand (Recorded Music NZ)	3
Norway (VG-lista)	3
Poland (Nielsen Music Control)	2
Romania (Nielsen Music Control)	5
Russia Airplay (TopHit)	6
Scottish Singles Sales (Official Charts)	2
Slovakia Airplay (ČNS IFPI)	10
South Korea International Singles (Gaon)	41
Spain (Promusicae)	3
Sweden (Sverigetopplistan)	3
Switzerland (Schweizer Hitparade)	8
Ukraine Airplay (TopHit)	8
UK Singles (Official Charts)	1
US Billboard Hot 100	1
US Adult Contemporary (Billboard)	28
US Adult Pop Airplay (Billboard)	7
US Dance Club Songs (Billboard)	2
US Dance Singles Sales (Billboard)	1
US Pop Airplay (Billboard)	1
US Hot R&B/Hip-Hop Songs (Billboard)	72
US Rhythmic Airplay (Billboard)	3

Weekly chart performance
Chart (2017)	Peak position
US Hot Dance/Electronic Songs (Billboard)	11

Weekly chart performance
Chart (2023–2025)	Peak position
Brazil Hot 100 (Billboard)	69
Global 200 (Billboard)	130
Poland Streaming (OLiS)	54

=== Monthly charts ===
Monthly chart performance
Chart (2008–2009)	Peak position
CIS Airplay (TopHit)	8
Russia Airplay (TopHit)	8
Ukraine Airplay (TopHit)	19

=== Year-end charts ===
Year-end chart performance
Chart (2008)	Position
Australia (ARIA)	7
Canada (Canadian Hot 100)	6
Canada CHR/Top 40 (Billboard)	3
CIS Airplay (TopHit)	110
Europe (European Hot 100 Singles)	67
France (SNEP)	73
New Zealand (Recorded Music NZ)	12
Russia Airplay (TopHit)	97
Sweden (Sverigetopplistan)	15
US Dance Club Play (Billboard)	50

Year-end chart performance
Chart (2009)	Position
Australia (ARIA)	70
Austria (Ö3 Austria Top 40)	38
Belgium (Ultratop Flanders)	42
Belgium (Ultratop Wallonia)	21
Brazil (Crowley)	16
Canada (Canadian Hot 100)	42
CIS Airplay (TopHit)	96
Croatia International Airplay (HRT)	64
Denmark (Tracklisten)	17
Europe (European Hot 100 Singles)	29
Germany (Media Control GfK)	34
Hungary (Dance Top 40)	88
Hungary (Rádiós Top 40)	7
Ireland (IRMA)	4
Japan Adult Contemporary (Billboard)	7
Netherlands (Dutch Top 40)	7
Netherlands (Single Top 100)	28
Norway (VG-lista)	28
Russia Airplay (TopHit)	94
Spain (PROMUSICAE)	21
Sweden (Sverigetopplistan)	85
Switzerland (Schweizer Hitparade)	20
Ukraine Airplay (TopHit)	123
UK Singles (Official Charts)	3
US Billboard Hot 100	3
US Adult Top 40 (Billboard)	27
US Pop Airplay (Billboard)	2
US Radio Songs (Billboard)	6
US Rhythmic Airplay (Billboard)	16
Worldwide (IFPI)	4

Year-end chart performance
Chart (2010)	Position
UK Singles (Official Charts)	186

Year-end chart performance
Chart (2017)	Position
US Hot Dance/Electronic Songs (Billboard)	67

=== Decade-end charts ===
Decade-end chart performance
Chart (2000–2009)	Position
Australia (ARIA)	12
Russia Airplay (TopHit)	153
UK Singles (Official Charts)	21
US Billboard Hot 100	35
US Mainstream Top 40 (Billboard)	15

=== All-time charts ===
All-time chart performance
Chart	Position
US Billboard Hot 100	196
US Billboard Hot 100 (Women)	62

== Certifications and sales ==
Certifications and sales
Region	Certification	Certified units/sales
Australia (ARIA)	14× Platinum	980,000^{‡}
Austria (IFPI Austria)	2× Platinum	60,000^{*}
Belgium (BRMA)	Gold	
Brazil (Pro-Música Brasil)	Diamond	250,000^{‡}
Canada (Music Canada)	Diamond	800,000^{‡}
Denmark (IFPI Danmark)	2× Platinum	30,000^{^}
France	—	88,000
Germany (BVMI)	2× Platinum	600,000^{‡}
Italy (FIMI)	Platinum	100,000^{‡}
Japan (RIAJ) Ringtone	Gold	100,000^{*}
Japan (RIAJ) PC download	Gold	100,000^{*}
New Zealand (RMNZ)	5× Platinum	150,000^{‡}
Norway (IFPI Norway)	3× Platinum	180,000^{‡}
South Korea	—	122,559
Spain (Promusicae)	Platinum	40,000^{*}
Spain (Promusicae) Since 2015	Platinum	60,000^{‡}
Sweden (GLF)	Platinum	20,000^{^}
Switzerland (IFPI Switzerland)	2× Platinum	60,000^{^}
United Kingdom (BPI)	4× Platinum	2,400,000^{‡}
United States (RIAA)	11× Platinum	11,000,000^{‡}
^{*} Sales figures based on certification alone.^{^} Shipments figures based on certification alone.^{‡} Sales+streaming figures based on certification alone.

== Release history ==
Release dates and formats
Region	Date	Format(s)	Version	Label(s)	Ref.
Various	April 8, 2008	Digital download	Original; remixes	Interscope; Streamline	
Various	June 17, 2008	CD single; digital download	Original; remixes	Interscope	
Germany	August 15, 2008	CD single	Original; remixes	Interscope	
United States	September 16, 2008	Contemporary hit radio	Original	Streamline; KonLive; Interscope	
United States	September 26, 2008	Rhythmic contemporary radio	Original	Streamline; KonLive; Interscope	
Various	November 4, 2008	Digital download	Remixes, pt. 2	Interscope	
Canada	November 25, 2008	Digital download	Glam as You mix	Interscope	
Canada	November 25, 2008	Digital download	Remixes	Interscope	
United Kingdom	December 29, 2008	7-inch single; CD single	Original	Polydor	
United States	January 6, 2009	7-inch single	Original	101 Distribution	
Italy	November 6, 2009	Radio airplay	Original	Universal	

== See also ==
- List of best-selling singles
- List of Canadian Hot 100 number-one singles of 2008
- List of number-one singles of 2008 (Australia)
- List of Billboard Hot 100 number ones of 2009
- List of UK Singles Chart number ones of the 2000s
- List of number-one singles of 2009 (Ireland)
- List of Dutch Top 40 number-one singles of 2009
- List of highest-certified singles in Australia
