= Jordan Knight Performs New Kids on the Block: The Remix Album =

Jordan Knight Performs New Kids On The Block: The Remix Album

Studio album by Jordan Knight
- Released: March 30, 2004
- Genre: Pop, pop rock, dance-pop, soul
- Length: 2:12:36
- Label: Empire Musicwerks, Universal
- Producer: Ryan "Dicio" Gardner

Jordan Knight chronology
| Jordan Knight (1999) | Jordan Knight Performs New Kids On The Block: The Remix Album (2004) | The Fix (2005) |

Jordan Knight Performs New Kids on the Block: The Remix Album is the second solo album released by singer Jordan Knight. Released in 2004, the album contains modern-day produced covers of songs from his band New Kids on the Block.

In 2007, the first disc was re-issued alone as Jordan Knight Sings NKOTB.

== Track listing ==
=== Disc 1 ===
1. "Step by Step" (Maurice Starr) 3:30
2. "Baby, I Believe In You" (Maurice Starr) 4:03
3. "Please Don't Go Girl" (Maurice Starr) 4:06
4. "Hangin' Tough" (Maurice Starr) 4:03
5. "If You Go Away" (John Bettis; T. Lorenz; Walter Afanasieff) 5:31
6. "My Favorite Girl" (Danny Wood; Donnie Wahlberg; Jordan Knight; Maurice Starr) 3:49
7. "You Got It (The Right Stuff)" (Maurice Starr) 3:55
8. "I'll Be Loving You (Forever)"(Maurice Starr) 4:05
9. "Let's Try It Again" (Maurice Starr) 3:44
10. "Cover Girl" (Maurice Starr) 3:23
11. "This One's for the Children" (Maurice Starr) 3:39
12. "Didn't I (Blow Your Mind)" (Thom Bell;William "Poogie" Hart) 3:42
13. "Valentine Girl" (Maurice Starr) 3:53
14. "Tonight" (Al Lancellotti; Maurice Starr) 4:07
15. "I'll Be Your Everything" [Original Demo] (Danny Wood; Jordan Knight; Tommy Page) 4:24

=== Disc 2 ===
1. You Got It (The Right Stuff) [European Remix] 3:23
2. Hangin' Tough [European Remix] 3:13
3. This One's For The Children [European Remix] 3:51
4. If You Go Away [European Remix] 4:32
5. Didn't I (Blow Your Mind) [European Remix] 3:47
6. Step By Step [European Remix] 4:02
7. Baby, I Believe In You [European Remix] 3:26
8. Valentine Girl [European Remix] 4:43
9. My Favorite Girl [European Remix] 4:06
10. I'll Be Loving You (Forever) [European Remix] 4:19
11. Tonight [European Remix] 2:54
12. Let's Try It Again [European Remix] 3:44
13. Cover Girl [European Remix] 3:26
14. Please Don't Go Girl [European Remix] 4:10
15. I'll Be Your Everything [European Remix] 4:37
16. Cover Girl [Additional Mix] 3:58
17. Tonight [Additional Mix] 3:16
18. I'll Be Loving You (Forever) [Additional Mix] 4:13
19. Step By Step [Additional Mix] 3:45
