= I'll Be Your Everything (Tommy Page song) =

Single by Tommy Page

from the album Paintings in My Mind
- B-side: "I'm Falling in Love"
- Released: February 19, 1990
- Length: 4:10
- Label: Sire
- Songwriters: Jordan Knight; Danny Wood; Tommy Page
- Producers: Jordan Knight; Donnie Wahlberg; Michael Jonzun

Tommy Page singles chronology
"A Zillion Kisses" (1989)	"I'll Be Your Everything" (1990)	"Turn On the Radio" (1990)

"I'll Be Your Everything" is a song by American pop music singer Tommy Page from his album Paintings in My Mind. Released as a single in early 1990, "I'll Be Your Everything" reached No. 1 on the US Billboard Hot 100 chart in April 1990. The song spent one week at No. 1, thirteen weeks in the top 40 and was certified gold by the RIAA. "I'll Be Your Everything" also peaked at No. 31 on the Billboard Adult Contemporary chart.

== Background and writing ==
The song was co-written by Page along with Jordan Knight and Danny Wood of the pop boy band New Kids on the Block. While on tour with the New Kids in 1989, Page was playing piano at a hotel one night when Knight approached him, and the two played piano together for a period of time. Knight played Page a verse from what would become "I'll Be Your Everything", a song that Knight wanted to save for a future solo project. The two later collaborated on finishing the song, and Page asked if he could record it for his next album. Knight agreed and produced the track, and fellow band members Danny Wood and Donnie Wahlberg participated in the project as well.

== Music video ==
The video peaked at number one for several weeks and featured model Robyn Leigh Hadem.

== Charts ==
=== Weekly charts ===
Chart (1990)	Peak position
Canada RPM Top Singles	5
Canada RPM Adult Contemporary	36
UK Singles	53
US Billboard Hot 100	1
US Billboard Adult Contemporary	31
US Cash Box Top 100	1

=== Year-end charts ===
Chart (1990)	Rank
Canada RPM Top Singles	58
US Billboard Hot 100	39
US Cash Box Top 100	42

== Certifications ==
Certifications for "I'll Be Your Everything"
Region	Certification	Certified units/sales
United States (RIAA)	Gold	500,000^{^}
^{^} Shipments figures based on certification alone.
