= Unfinished (album) =

Studio album by Jordan Knight
- Released: May 31, 2011
- Recorded: November 2010–April 2011
- Genre: R&B; pop; dance-pop
- Length: 39:51
- Label: eOne; JK Music; Mass Appeal Entertainment
- Producer: Colby O'Donis; Marcus "DL" Siskind; Steve "Nef" Saxon; Jordan Knight; Mike Krompass; Jonas Jeberg; Clinton Sparks; DJ Snake; Kadis & Sean; Ryan M. Tedder; Charles "Chizzy" Stephens III; Aaron Kleinstub; "JR" Hutson; Christian Davis; Eddie Galan; Steven "Stizzle" Schneider; Michael Linney; Ivan "Ill Factor" Corraliza; Aaron Pearce

Jordan Knight chronology
Love Songs (2006)	Unfinished (2011)	Nick & Knight (2014)

Singles from Unfinished
- 1. "Let's Go Higher" Released: March 1, 2011; 2. "Stingy" Released: June 29, 2011

Professional ratings
Review scores
Source	Rating
Allmusic	3/5 stars

Unfinished is the third studio album by American singer Jordan Knight, released on May 31, 2011. It is Knight's first album in almost five years since Love Songs (2006). The album was preceded by the lead single, "Let's Go Higher" on March 1, 2011. The album charted at number 48 on the Billboard 200 in the United States, and at number 55 in Canada. The album features production by Jordan Knight, Clinton Sparks, Colby O'Donis, Aaron Pearce, Jonas Jeberg, Ryan M. Tedder (Not to be confused with Ryan Tedder of OneRepublic fame) and more.

== Track listing ==
No.	Title	Writer(s)	Producer(s)	Length
1.	"Let's Go Higher"	Colby O'Donis, Harry Bonner Jr., Jordan Knight, Marcus Siskind, Steve Saxon	Colby O'Donis, Marcus "DL" Siskind, Steve "Nef" Saxon, Jordan Knight	4:08
2.	"Unfinished"	Kasia Livingston, Knight, Mike Krompass	Mike Krompass	3:14
3.	"Like a Wave"	Christian Davis, Alex Cantrell, Jonas Jeberg	Jonas Jeberg	3:29
4.	"One More Night"	Nasri Atweh, Knight, Clinton Sparks, DJ Snake	Clinton Sparks, DJ Snake	3:39
5.	"Stingy" (featuring Donnie Wahlberg)	Micah Powell, Melvin Moore, Floyd Bentley, Knight, Sean Marshall, Gary Spriggs	Kadis & Sean	4:06
6.	"Kiss It Away"	R. Ashley, S. Rivers, Knight, Ryan Tedder, Charles Stephens III	Ryan Tedder, Charles "Chizzy" Stephens III	3:17
7.	"Inside"	Alvin Garrett, Knight, Ryan Tedder, Aaron Kleinstub	Ryan Tedder, Aaron Kleinstub	3:42
8.	"O-Face"	Knight, Davis, Lee Hutson Jr.	"JR" Hutson, Jordan Knight, Christian Davis	3:15
9.	"Rockstar"	Eddie Galan, Steven Schneider, Davis, Knight	Eddie Galan, Steven "Stizzle" Schneider, Christian Davis, Mike Krompass, Jordan Knight	4:03
10.	"Up N Down"	Michael Linney, Davis, Ivan Corraliza, Knight	Michael Linney, Ivan "Ill Factor" Corraliza, Christian Davis	3:24
11.	"Believe"	K. Dean, Aaron Pearce, Knight	Aaron Pearce	3:36

Deluxe Edition bonus track
No.	Title	Writer(s)	Producer(s)	Length
12.	"Never Alone"	Ashley, Rivers, Knight, Ryan Tedder	Ryan Tedder	3:39

German Edition additional track
No.	Title	Length
13.	"Let's Go Higher" (Disco Fries Remix)	5:04

- Credited adapted from album liner notes.

== Charts ==
Chart (2011)	Peak position
Canadian Albums Chart	55
US Billboard 200	48
US Billboard Digital Albums	23
US Billboard Independent Albums	8
