= Tommy Page (album) =

Studio album by Tommy Page
- Released: July 19, 1988
- Studio: Unique Recording Studios; Atlantic Studios, New York, NY; Eden Studios, London, England; Power Station Studios, New York, NY; Quad Recording Studios, New York, NY; Soundtrack Recording Studios, New York, NY
- Genre: Pop; dance-pop; synthpop
- Length: 36:56
- Label: Sire; Warner Bros.
- Producer: Mark Kamins; David Motion; Arif Mardin; Joe Mardin

Tommy Page chronology
Tommy Page (1988)	Republic of Idols (1989)

Singles from Tommy Page
- 1. "Turning Me On" Released: 1988; 2. "A Shoulder to Cry On" Released: 1988; 3. "I Think I'm in Love (promo)" Released: 1988; 4. "A Zillion Kisses" Released: 1989

Tommy Page is the self-titled debut studio album by American singer-songwriter Tommy Page, released in 1988 on Sire Records and Warner Bros. Records. The album contains Page's minor and early hits, such as "A Shoulder to Cry On" and "A Zillion Kisses".

== Track listing ==
All songs are written by Tommy Page and L. Russell Brown, except where noted; tracks produced by Mark Kamins, except where noted.

Side A
No.	Title	Writer(s)	Producer(s)	Length
1.	"A Zillion Kisses"			3:07
2.	"Turning Me On"			3:55
3.	"African Sunset"			4:06
4.	"I Think I'm in Love"	Page	David Motion	3:24
5.	"Hard to Be Normal"		Motion	3:10

Side B
No.	Title	Writer(s)	Producer(s)	Length
1.	"I Love London"		Motion	3:54
2.	"Making My Move"			3:40
3.	"Love Takes Over"	Page; Shelly Peiken		4:27
4.	"A Shoulder to Cry On"	Page	Arif Mardin; Joe Mardin	3:20
5.	"Minetta Lane"			3:01

Japan CD bonus track
No.	Title	Length
1.	"The Shag" ('88 Mix)	3:58

== Singles ==
Three singles and one promo single (four singles overall) were released from the album. The second single, "A Shoulder to Cry On", became Page's first hit, peaking at #29 on the US music chart. Another hit from the album, "A Zillion Kisses", reached #45 on the Billboard Dance Club Songs.

== Personnel ==
- Tommy Page - vocals
- Art Labriola, Miguel Kertsman, Tommy Page - keyboards
- Ira Siegal, Matthew Cang - guitars
- Alan Park, Robbie Kondor - piano
- Tony Levin - bass
- Joe Mardin - drums
- Bashiri Johnson - percussions
- Gerald Ashbey, Phil Eastop - French horn
- Jeffrey Smith - saxophone
- Tommy Page, Shelly Peiken, Maria Adler - background vocals

== Release history ==
Country	Date	Label
United States	1988	Sire Records
Germany	1988	Sire Records
Japan	1988	Sire Records
Indonesia	1988	Sire Records
South Korea	1988	Warner Bros. Records
Colombia	1990	Warner Bros. Records
