= What You Got (Colby O'Donis song) =

Single by Colby O'Donis featuring Akon

from the album Colby O
- Released: February 26, 2008
- Recorded: 2007
- Genre: R&B; electropop
- Length: 4:05 (album version); 3:38 (radio edit)
- Label: Konvict; Interscope
- Songwriter(s): Aliaune Thiam; Giorgio Tuinfort
- Producer(s): Akon; Tuinfort

Colby O'Donis singles chronology
"What You Got" (2008)	"Just Dance" (2008)

Akon singles chronology
"Wanna Be Startin' 2008" (2008)	"What You Got" (2008)	"I Can't Wait" (2008)

"What You Got" is the debut single from Colby O'Donis' debut album, titled Colby O. The song features Akon, who also wrote and produced the track with Giorgio Tuinfort. A Spanish version of the song was leaked on the Internet titled "¿Cuánto Quieres?", meaning "How Much You Want?", however, Akon's verse is still in English. A rap remix was also leaked via Internet featuring Fatman Scoop and Larceny Entertainment's Klepto. It is O'Donis' only charted solo single to date.

== Music video ==
A music video was produced to promote the single. An independent video was also produced by Larceny Entertainment to promote the rap remix of this single featuring Klepto. It was released on the internet soon after the release of the original video.

== Chart performance ==
"What You Got" debuted on the Billboard Hot 100 on the week of March 15, 2008 at number 86. It peaked at number 14 on the week of May 31, 2008 and stayed in the top 50 for twenty-five weeks. It debuted at number 84 in Canada on the week of May 31, 2008 and peaked at number 29 on the week of August 2, 2008. It stayed on the chart for seventeen weeks. It peaked at number 59 in Sweden for two nonconsecutive weeks: July 31 and August 14.

== Charts ==
=== Weekly charts ===
Chart (2008)	Peak position
Canada (Canadian Hot 100)	29
Sweden (Sverigetopplistan)	59
US Billboard Hot 100	14
US Hot R&B/Hip-Hop Songs (Billboard)	84
US Pop Airplay (Billboard)	8
US Rhythmic (Billboard)	2

=== Year-end charts ===
Chart (2008)	Position
US Billboard Hot 100	51
US Rhythmic (Billboard)	9
