= I Could Never Take the Place of Your Man =

1987 single by Prince

- US 7" single

Single by Prince

from the album Sign o' the Times
- B-side: "Hot Thing"
- Released: November 3, 1987
- Recorded: Hollywood Sound Recorders (Studio A), May 23, 1979 (Basic tracking of 1979 version) Sunset Sound, July 16, 1986 (Basic tracking of album version)
- Genre: Power pop; pop rock; new wave; funk; dance-pop
- Length: 3:13 (1979 version); 3:39 (7" edit); 6:31 (album/12" version)
- Label: Paisley Park; Warner Bros.
- Songwriter: Prince
- Producer: Prince

Prince singles chronology
"U Got the Look" (1987)	"I Could Never Take the Place of Your Man" / "Hot Thing" (1987)	"Alphabet St." (1988)

"I Could Never Take the Place of Your Man" is a song written and recorded by American musician Prince. It was released as the final single from his ninth studio album Sign o' the Times (1987), becoming the third Top 10 hit from the album. It has since been covered by numerous artists.

== Background ==
The original 1979 version was recorded during the sessions that would be his self-titled album. When working on Sign o' the Times, Prince listened to the original version again, deciding to overhaul it with a new drum pattern on a LinnDrum, then rerecording the bass, synthesizers, guitars and vocal tracks.

The song features two guitar solos, one wild and energetic and one more bluesy and subdued in the full album cut. The song consists of two verses and two choruses, followed by a lengthy instrumental coda.

The lyrics paint the image of a woman seeking a man to replace the one who left, while Prince refuses, saying that she would not be satisfied with a one-night stand.

Cash Box called it an "exceptional tune [that] is skillfully produced and performed".

== Music video ==
The music video was made using the song's section in the Sign “☮” the Times film, and is a live take of the song and included the horn section of Eric Leeds and Atlanta Bliss. This version includes a horn solo in the song's coda, lifting a part from the Camille and The Black Album track, "Rockhard in a Funky Place".

== B-side ==
The single was backed with "Hot Thing", also from Sign “☮” the Times. The twelve-inch single includes the full album version of "I Could Never Take the Place of Your Man", as well as several remixes of "Hot Thing". One of these was included on the Ultimate compilation album in 2006. "Hot Thing" received enough airplay by DJs to chart on its own, reaching number 63.

== Track listing ==
=== 7": Paisley Park / 7-28288 (US) ===
1. "I Could Never Take the Place of Your Man" (fade) – 3:39
2. "Hot Thing" (edit) – 3:40

=== 12": Paisley Park / 0-20728 (US) ===
1. "I Could Never Take the Place of Your Man" – 6:31
2. "Hot Thing" (edit) – 3:40
3. "Hot Thing" (extended remix) – 8:32
4. "Hot Thing" (dub version) – 6:53

=== 12": Warner Bros / W8288T (UK) ===
1. "I Could Never Take the Place of Your Man" – 6:31
2. "Hot Thing" (edit) – 3:40
3. "Hot Thing" (extended remix) – 8:32

*also released as a picture disc (W8288TP)

== Personnel ==
Credits adapted from Duane Tudahl, Benoît Clerc and Guitarcloud.

=== Album version ===
==== Musicians ====
- Prince – lead and backing vocals, electric and acoustic guitars, Fairlight CMI, Oberheim OB-8, bass guitar, LinnDrum, handclaps
- Susannah Melvoin – possible backing vocals

==== Technical ====
- Prince – producer
- Susan Rogers and Coke Johnson – recording engineer
- Todd Herreman – assistant recording engineer

=== 1979 version ===
==== Musicians ====
- Prince – vocals, electric guitar, bass, drums, synthesizers, claps, backing vocals

==== Technical ====
- Prince – producer
- Bob Muckler – recording engineer

== Charts ==
=== Weekly charts ===
Chart performance for "I Could Never Take the Place of Your Man"
Chart (1987–1988)	Peak position
Belgium (Ultratop 50 Flanders)	28
Italy Airplay (Music & Media)	7
Netherlands (Single Top 100)	30
New Zealand (Recorded Music NZ)	9
UK Singles (Official Charts)	29
US Billboard Hot 100	10

== Jordan Knight version ==
"I Could Never Take the Place of Your Man"

Single by Jordan Knight

from the album Jordan Knight
- Released: July 20, 1999
- Recorded: 1999
- Genre: Pop; R&B
- Length: 4:49
- Label: Interscope
- Songwriter: Prince
- Producer: Robin Thicke

Jordan Knight singles chronology
"Give It to You" (1999)	"I Could Never Take the Place of Your Man" (1999)	"Where Is Your Heart Tonight" (2005)

Jordan Knight of New Kids on the Block, recorded a version of the song as a ballad for his 1999 self-titled solo album. The video debuted July 27, 1999, on TRL at number 10. It features background vocals by Knight and Robin Thicke.

=== Track listing ===
US single

1. "I Could Never Take the Place of Your Man" (Soul Solution Radio Edit) – 4:03
2. "I Could Never Take the Place of Your Man" (LP version) – 4:04

US 12" vinyl

A1 "I Could Never Take the Place of Your Man" (Soul Solution Ext. Vox) – 10:31
A2 "I Could Never Take the Place of Your Man" (Soul Solution Radio Edit) – 4:03
B1 "I Could Never Take the Place of Your Man" (CZR's Funk Parlor Remix) – 8:13
B2 "I Could Never Take the Place of Your Man" (Soul Solution Dub) – 7:48

UK Maxi-CD

1. "I Could Never Take the Place of Your Man" (LP version) – 4:06
2. "I Could Never Take the Place of Your Man" (Uptempo Remix Radio Edit) – 3:54
3. "I Could Never Take the Place of Your Man" (Soul Solution Radio Mix) – 4:09
4. "Give It to You" (Club Remix) – 5:32
5. "I Could Never Take the Place of Your Man" (CD-ROM video) – 4:09

== Notable cover versions ==
- The Goo Goo Dolls included a cover version of "I Could Never Take the Place of Your Man" (shortened to "Never Take the Place of Your Man") on their 1990 album Hold Me Up. The vocals for this version are sung by Lance Diamond who performed in their hometown of Buffalo, New York.
- Flesh for Lulu released a live cover on their 1990 album Final Vinyl (and Live Flesh).
- Sigue Sigue Sputnik covered it on their 2007 EP Ray of Light.
- After performing the song live on tour, Eels recorded a cover for their 2008 album Useless Trinkets. The album also features a cover of "If I Was Your Girlfriend", another song from Prince's Sign “☮” the Times album. The video for this version is on the DVD Eels with Strings: Live at Town Hall, but without the audio. Authorization for use of the song was not received and the audio was replaced by an 'emergency commentary' explaining the situation in a veiled, but humorous manner by Eels leader E and guitarist The Chet.
- Wellington International Ukulele Orchestra included a cover on their 2009 EP The Dreaming.
- Seattle band Fruit Bats reference the track in their ballad "Singing Joy to the World" from the 2010 release The Ruminant Band.
- My Morning Jacket performed a cover of "I Could Never Take the Place of Your Man" during their set at the 2005 Bonnaroo Music Festival. They covered the song again in May 2016 at Iroquois Amphitheater in Louisville as a tribute to Prince after his death a few weeks prior.
- Aaron Freeman (aka Gene Ween) has performed this track live with Freeman in 2014.
- Minneapolis rock band The Replacements covered the song as documented in an unauthorized compilation "Essential Mats: Obscurities, Live Tracks, & Album Cuts."
- Country music singer Christian Kane has also performed a cover of this song.
