= A Shoulder to Cry On (Tommy Page song) =

Single by Tommy Page

from the album Tommy Page
- B-side: "Christmas With You"
- Released: February 13, 1989
- Genre: Pop
- Length: 3:28
- Label: Sire
- Songwriter: Tommy Page
- Producers: Arif Mardin; Joe Mardin

Tommy Page singles chronology
"The Shag" (1988)	"A Shoulder to Cry On" (1989)	"A Zillion Kisses" (1989)

"A Shoulder to Cry On" is a ballad performed by American singer-songwriter Tommy Page. Released in 1988, the song became one of Page's early hits, peaking at number 29 on the Billboard Hot 100. Lyrically, the song is about a man who will be "a shoulder to cry on" for his friend (possibly his lover).

== Background and writing ==
"A Shoulder to Cry On" was written by Page solely. The song is one of Page's early songs. Years before the song was released, one of Page's friends was very sick. To show her that his thoughts were with her, he composed this ballad. Page confessed that whenever he wrote a love song, it was about someone who didn't exist. However, he explained that the song was not about his imagination, but about his friend who was very sick at that time.

== Track listing ==
1. "A Shoulder to Cry On" – 3:28
2. "Christmas Without You" – 4:06
