= Let's Go Higher (Jordan Knight song) =

Single by Jordan Knight

from the album Unfinished
- Released: March 1, 2011
- Recorded: December 2010
- Genre: Dance-pop
- Length: 4:06
- Label: JK Music; eOne; Mass Appeal Entertainment
- Songwriter: Jordan Knight
- Producers: Colby O'Donis, Marcus Siskind

Jordan Knight singles chronology
"Say Goodbye" (2006)	"Let's Go Higher" (2011)	"Stingy" (2011)

Music video
- "Let's Go Higher" on YouTube

"Let's Go Higher" is the first single from Jordan Knight's third studio album Unfinished, released on May 31, 2011. It was released on March 1, 2011 on iTunes. This is Jordan Knight's first solo single in over 5 years, the last one being "Say Goodbye" (2006).

== Release ==
Jordan Knight's single "Let's Go Higher" was released on March 1, 2011. The single is available as a digital download on iTunes.

== Background ==
The song was written by Jordan Knight and Mauli B and produced by onetime Lady Gaga collaborator Colby O'Donis. "I had a track and I really liked this track. I needed a writer to see if they could put some good idea over it," Knight said of another song he had been working on. "I was always talking about Colby O'Donis. He's got a great vibe," he recalled.

== Music video ==
The video was filmed in April 2011. About the music video, Knight said: "Fans can expect the video to be a mix between cool, sexy and fun" - though the process wasn't easy.

The official music video for "Let's Go Higher" was premiered on E! Online on April 21, 2011 and was uploaded on YouTube on April 23. The video features Jordan Knight dazzled by disco lights, singing and dancing in a night club being surrounded by ladies on the dance floor, along with the infectious beats and grooves, guiding the song with his dreamy voice. This is Jordan Knight's first solo music video in almost 12 years, the last one being for "I Could Never Take the Place of Your Man" (1999). Of the music video he said, "It was a lot of work because the song is happy and upbeat, but sometimes it's harder to translate that into video. I'm not 14. I can't jump around and do that kind of thing, but you still want it to be happy and fun", he added.
