= Colby O'Donis =

American singer (born 1989)

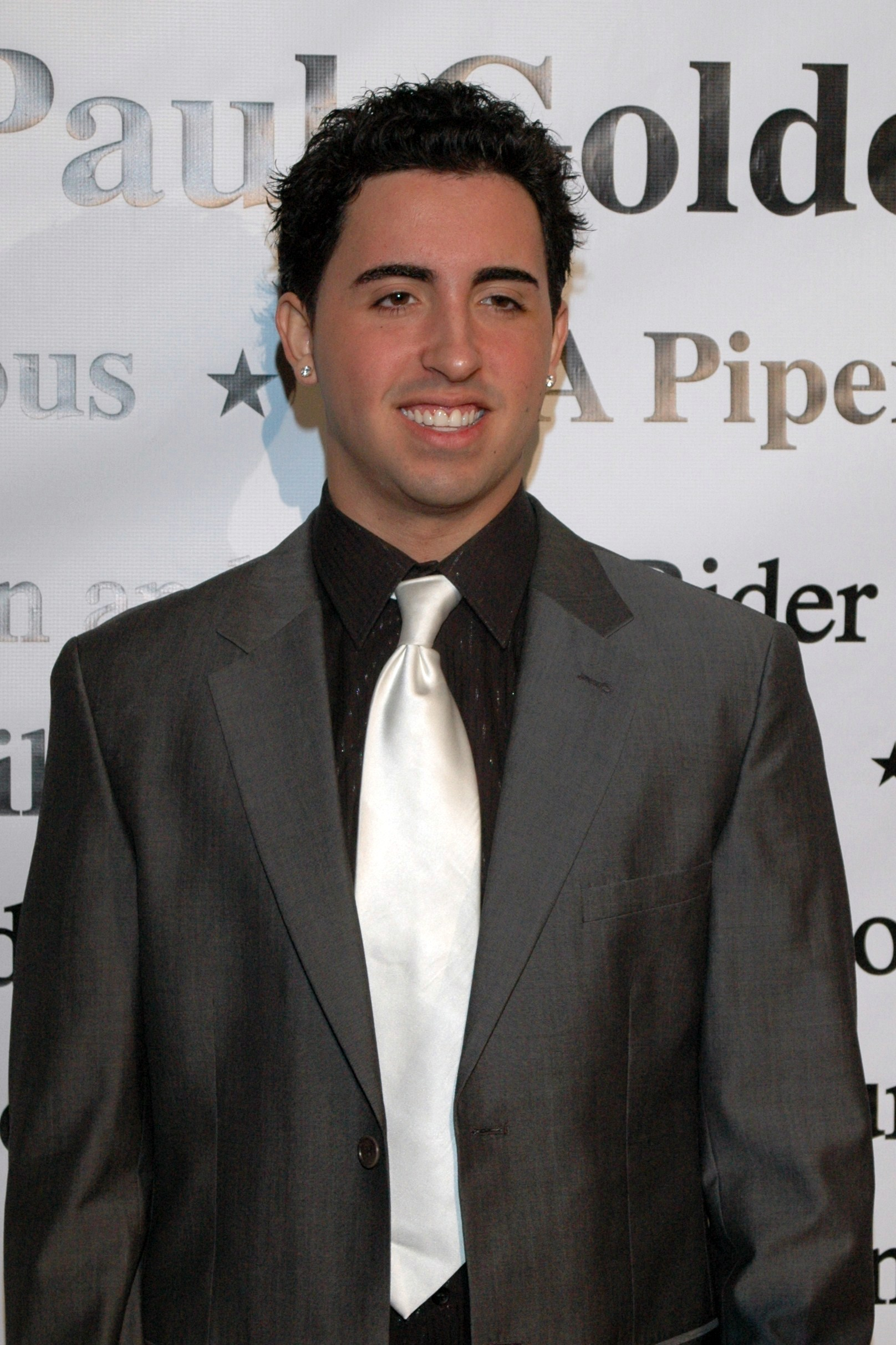
- O'Donis on the red carpet for a viewing event before the 2009 Oscars

Background information
- Born: Colby O'Donis Colón; March 14, 1989 (age 37); Queens, New York, U.S.
- Origin: Orlando, Florida, U.S.
- Genres: R&B; pop
- Occupations: Singer; songwriter; record producer; dancer
- Works: Discography; production
- Years active: 1997–present
- Labels: KonLive; Geffen
- Producer(s): Akon
- Spouse: Erin Yvonne (m. 2016)
- Children: 1
- Website: colbyodonis.com
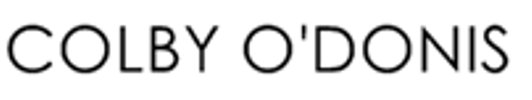

Colby O'Donis Colón (/oʊdɒˈnɪs/; born March 14, 1989) is an American singer. He is best known for his guest appearance on Lady Gaga's 2008 single "Just Dance" which peaked atop the Billboard Hot 100, spent over 11 months on the chart, and received diamond certification by the Recording Industry Association of America (RIAA). Due to label conflicts, Senegalese-American singer Akon was unable to perform on the song and recruited O'Donis to do so; O'Donis was Lady Gaga's labelmate on Akon's KonLive Distribution label, to which he signed in 2007.

Released by KonLive's joint venture with Geffen Records, his debut studio album, Colby O (2008), peaked at number 41 on the Billboard 200. Its lead single, "What You Got" (featuring Akon) peaked within the top 20 of the Billboard Hot 100, along with his guest performance alongside Kardinal Offishall on Akon's single "Beautiful" that same year. Colby O served as his only release on a major label, although he has since written songs for other artists including Jordan Knight and Che'Nelle.

== Early life ==
O'Donis was born in Queens, New York and grew up there and in Florida. He is of Puerto Rican and Italian descent. His mother, Olga, is a singer once crowned Miss Puerto Rico in New York, and his father, Freddy "Fast Freddy" Colón is a disc jockey who worked at WQHT, a radio station in Lower Manhattan, New York. He was named after Colby O'Donis, a firefighter who was killed while saving his father's life. O'Donis has a sister who is five years older. He said that for seven years she helped pay for his dance, piano, and guitar lessons from her own paychecks. His parents first realized his singing talent when he won a talent show singing a Michael Jackson song when he was only three and a half.

== Career ==
=== 1997–2007: Beginnings ===
When O'Donis was eight, his parents moved to Orlando, Florida and a year later, he began collaborating with the production group Full Force, the same group which worked with Backstreet Boys, NSYNC, and Britney Spears. O'Donis' rise to fame began at age ten, when he became the youngest recording artist ever signed to Motown in order to do a song for a major motion picture soundtrack. The song, titled "Mouse in the House", was featured on the Stuart Little soundtrack. Soon afterwards, he began taking guitar lessons with Johan Oiested, a musician in Carlos Santana's rhythm section. At the age of 11, he was making regular appearances as an actor on the television series Grandpa's Garage. When he was 12, his father bought him his first production studio, and by the time he had reached fourteen, O'Donis was opening local Florida shows for major recording artists including Backstreet Boys, Brian McKnight, 98 Degrees, Britney Spears, and Ne-Yo. Shortly after his fifteenth birthday, O'Donis' parents made the decision to go to Los Angeles and pursue a recording deal for him. After the move, O'Donis was introduced to Genuine Music Group, where he began collaborating on producing an LP album consisting of songs from his catalog and songs co-written by producers Damon Sharpe, Gregg Pagani, and Brion James.

In 2006, O'Donis almost signed a record deal with Babyface. However, before the deal was finalized, O'Donis' management arranged a meeting with O'Donis and Akon. O'Donis played Akon his first demo of fourteen songs in a recording studio, and Akon loved and "really connected with it". A few weeks later, they set up a session and began working on music where O'Donis said they had really good chemistry from the start. At the time, Akon told O'Donis that he was starting his own label, called Konvict Muzik, and asked if he wanted to be a part of it. O'Donis agreed and, for the next two years, he waited for the label to "get going and achieve the stature they need to launch new artists" before being officially signed.

O'Donis has said that, before he signed with Interscope Records and Akon, he had already released six independent record albums.

=== 2008–2009: Breakthrough with "Just Dance" and debut album ===
O'Donis's first single, "What You Got" (featuring Akon), was released on February 26, 2008, and his second single, titled "Don't Turn Back", was released on June 24, 2008. Both singles were released for digital download via iTunes and are featured on his debut album, Colby O. O'Donis was featured on Lady Gaga's debut single, "Just Dance", earning him a nomination for Best Dance Recording at the 50th Annual Grammy Awards. To date, it has been his most successful single.

In 2009, O'Donis and Gaga won Best Dance Recording at the Teen Choice Awards for "Just Dance". He also performed a duet with Brooke Hogan entitled "Hey Yo!" later that year, in addition to his single "I Wanna Touch You" being released to radio. The music video for the latter premiered on July 27, 2009. Also in that year, he was featured in the Akon song "Beautiful".

=== 2010–present: Later career and Start Over ===
In 2010, O'Donis was featured in a song called "What You Waiting For" by Malaysian artist Mizz Nina, which has received extensive airplay in Malaysia and other Southeast Asian countries. He released a single, "Texting Flirtation." In 2011, O'Donis signed with Z-Entertainment Records and released the digital single "Like Me". The music video premiered on February 9, 2012, on YouTube.

In 2013, after what he described as "a four-year hiatus", O'Donis began working on his second studio album, titled Start Over. He released singles "Lean", "Turn This Night Around", "Come Back", "State of Mind", and "Kiss Those Lips" to promote the album. Although planned for a release date in early 2014, the album was never released. In March 2020, he announced on Instagram that he would be working on new music amidst the COVID-19 pandemic. His single "Hold On" was released on March 14.

== Artistry ==
O'Donis grew up listening to artists including the Temptations, Luther Vandross, Michael Jackson, and Usher.

== Personal life ==
O'Donis and Erin Yvonne, a dancer, actress, and life coach married on November 21, 2016. Their first child, a daughter, was born in October 2019.

== Discography ==
- Colby O (2008)

== Filmography ==
Film and television
Year	Title	Role	Notes
2000–2005	Grandpa's Garage	Diego	Main role
2006	Ned's Declassified School Survival Guide	Nelson Duckworth / Quack	1 episode: "Nicknames and Shyness"
2009	The Pig People	Alex	Horror movie
2009	Brooke Knows Best	Self	1 episode: “Brooke’s New Beau”

== Awards and nominations ==
Year	Association	Category	Recipient	Result
2009	Grammy Awards	Best Dance Recording	"Just Dance" (with Lady Gaga)	Nominated
2009	American Latino Awards	Favorite Newcomer	Colby O'Donis	Won
2009	Teen Choice Awards	Choice Music Hook-Up	"Just Dance" (with Lady Gaga)	Won
2010	Grammy Awards	Album of the Year	The Fame (as featured artist)	Nominated
