= Give It to You (Jordan Knight song) =

1999 single by Jordan Knight

Single by Jordan Knight

from the album Jordan Knight
- Released: February 16, 1999
- Genre: Electro-funk; R&B
- Length: 4:49
- Label: Interscope
- Songwriters: Jordan Knight; James Harris III; Terry Lewis; Robin Thicke
- Producers: Jimmy Jam; Terry Lewis

Jordan Knight singles chronology
"Give It to You" (1999)	"I Could Never Take the Place of Your Man" (1999)

Music video
- "Give It to You" on YouTube

"Give It to You" is the debut solo single by American singer Jordan Knight (from New Kids on the Block) from his self-titled album, Jordan Knight (1999). It is his most well-known single to date as a solo artist.

== Chart performance ==
The song became Knight's first and only top 10 solo hit on the Billboard Hot 100, peaking at number 10. It also hit number 35 on the Hot Dance Music/Club Play chart, and reached gold status soon afterward. It peaked at number 5 on the UK Singles Chart.

== Music video ==
Directed by Darren Grant, the video starts off in an amusement park with Knight and his friends getting off by a Land Rover Defender. His friends start off with a ballroom dance and then move into complex hip-hop choreography. The music video is based on the movie Grease, with the cool guy at first overlooking the "nerdy" girl. But when she shows up in a red bedazzled top and leather pants and stubs out her cigarette (like Sandy does at the end of Grease), he finally notices her and they dance. Choreographer Darrin Henson makes a cameo appearance in the music video, on the left to Jordan Knight in the red. He was also the choreographer of the dance in the video. Marisa Ramirez plays the girl who joins Knight in the video. The Miami bass break in the video was only heard on selected versions of the single.

The video was nominated for Best Dance Video at the 1999 MTV Video Music Awards but lost to "Livin' La Vida Loca" by Ricky Martin.

== Live performance ==
On May 25, 1999, Knight promoted the release of his self-titled debut album by performing the song live on Live with Regis and Kathie Lee.

== Track listings ==
US CD maxi-single

1. "Give It to You" (video version) – 4:29
2. "Give It to You" (95 South remix) – 5:13
3. "Give It to You" (Red Tacones edit) – 3:50
4. "Give It to You" (Red Tacones Dark dub) – 7:15
5. "Give It to You" (Fernando G's radio edit) – 4:22

UK CD single

1. "Give It to You" (10° Below Steelpan vocal) – 5:22
2. "Give It to You" (10° Below Musique vocals) – 4:20
3. "Give It to You" (Stepchild radio edit) – 4:26
4. "Give It to You" (95 South remix) – 5:13

== Charts ==
=== Weekly charts ===
Chart (1999)	Peak position
Australia (ARIA)	33
Canada (Nielsen SoundScan)	11
Canada Top Singles (RPM)	32
Europe (European Hot 100 Singles)	23
Germany (GfK)	61
Iceland (Íslenski Listinn Topp 40)	34
Ireland (IRMA)	30
Netherlands (Dutch Top 40)	20
Netherlands (Single Top 100)	40
New Zealand (Recorded Music NZ)	21
Scottish Singles Sales (Official Charts)	17
Sweden (Sverigetopplistan)	55
UK Singles (Official Charts)	5
UK Airplay (Music Week)	10
UK Hip Hop/R&B (Official Charts)	1
US Billboard Hot 100	10
US Dance Club Songs (Billboard)	35
US Dance Singles Sales (Billboard)	9
US Pop Airplay (Billboard)	13
US Rhythmic Airplay (Billboard)	19

=== Year-end charts ===
Chart (1999)	Position
Netherlands (Dutch Top 40)	156
UK Singles (OCC)	128
US Billboard Hot 100	63
US Mainstream Top 40 (Billboard)	63
US Maxi-Singles Sales (Billboard)	31
US Rhythmic Top 40 (Billboard)	98

== Certifications ==
Region	Certification	Certified units/sales
United States (RIAA)	Gold	900,000

== Release history ==
Region	Date	Format(s)	Label(s)	Ref.
United States	February 16, 1999	7-inch vinyl; 12-inch vinyl; CD; maxi-CD; cassette	Interscope	
Canada	March 2, 1999	CD	Interscope	
United States	March 9, 1999	Contemporary hit radio	Interscope	
United States	April 26, 1999	Rhythmic contemporary radio	Interscope	
United Kingdom	October 4, 1999	CD; cassette	Interscope	
