= Tommy Page =

American singer-songwriter (1967-2017)

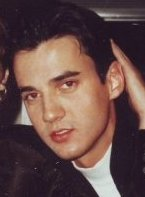
- Page c. 1991

Background information
- Born: Thomas Alden Page; May 24, 1967; Glen Ridge, New Jersey, U.S.
- Died: March 3, 2017 (aged 49) East Stroudsburg, Pennsylvania, U.S.
- Genres: Pop, dance, freestyle
- Occupations: Singer, musician, songwriter
- Instruments: Vocals, piano
- Years active: 1985–2017
- Labels: Sire/Warner Bros. Pony Canyon
- Website: tommypage.com

Thomas Alden Page (May 24, 1967 – March 3, 2017 (Note: Despite most sources stating he was born in 1970, his tombstone gives a birth year of 1967.)) was an American singer-songwriter, best known for his 1990 hit single "I'll Be Your Everything" and was later a music industry executive. Page collaborated with many artists, including New Kids on the Block, Tiffany, Michael Bolton and Diane Warren, as well as Malaysian singers Amy Mastura and Fauziah Latiff.

== Early life ==
Page was born on May 24, 1967, in Glen Ridge, New Jersey. He grew up in nearby West Caldwell. He graduated from James Caldwell High School in 1985. Page took a leave of absence from New York University's Stern School of Business when his music career began to take off. He returned to finish his remaining two years and graduated in 1997.

== Career ==
In 1985, Tommy and his brother, Bill Page, formed a band called Broken Promises in New Jersey. They were signed to Broccoli Rabe Records and released a self-titled four-track EP. Tommy is credited as playing keyboards, piano, and performs backing vocals. A year later, to help support himself during his first year at Stern, Page worked as a cloakroom attendant in a popular New York nightclub called Nell's. The job gave Page a chance to play his demo tape to the house DJ, who then used the demos as part of his club mixes. The unknown sounds so impressed him that soon Page was introduced to Sire Records founder Seymour Stein. Shortly after, he was asked to write the theme tune of the film Shag and released it as his first single. Page's self-titled debut album was released by Sire/Warner Bros. Records in November 1988 and contained hits such as "A Zillion Kisses", "Turning Me On", "I Think I'm in Love", and "A Shoulder to Cry On".

The follow-up album Paintings in My Mind (which he dedicated to his grandmother) gave Page a No. 1 single in the U.S., "I'll Be Your Everything", a song that was written with and features members of New Kids on the Block. Other singles from the album that were released after that were "When I Dream of You" and "Turn on the Radio" (another New Kids on the Block collaboration). The album also features "Don't Give Up on Love", a duet with Latin freestyle singer Sa-Fire. Page and Sa-Fire co-wrote the song, which was released as a single overseas. Page's third album, released in 1991, was titled From the Heart, and his vocals there showcased a wider range with higher notes than previous efforts. On this album, the ballads were more orchestral. Tommy cited the songs in the album were inspired by Wilson Phillips. The first single, "Whenever You Close Your Eyes", saw Page working with Michael Bolton and Diane Warren. "Under the Rainbow" and "Madly in Love" also were released as singles. Page also appeared on an episode of Full House, titled "Crushed", which first aired on January 14, 1992. In the episode, he sings a special song to Stephanie Tanner on her tenth birthday, but spends the following day with her sister DJ, much to Stephanie's dismay.

As an appreciation to his fans in Asia, Page released another album, A Friend to Rely On, in 1992. It contains a duet with Sally Yeh titled "I'm Always Dreaming of You" as well as a cover of Nik Kershaw's "Wouldn't It Be Good" and a song penned with Donna De Lory (best known as Madonna's backing singer) called "Heaven in Your Eyes". As house music was the current trend, the upbeat songs were produced in such form. In 1993, Page and Latin freestyle singer Sa-Fire teamed to create a house-music group called La Casa, also featuring Allan Edwards Tibbett and Dacia Palmer. Page and Sa-Fire wrote and produced three songs, "Show Me the Way", "Get to You" and "Dance to My Music" for the group. The songs appeared on New Faces, a house-music compilation on Sire/Warner Bros. Records.

In 1994, before releasing his next album, Time, Page replaced Donny Osmond for three months in Andrew Lloyd Webber's Broadway musical Joseph and the Amazing Technicolor Dreamcoat. Page concentrated on releasing his following albums in Asia, especially after he signed with the Japanese label Pony Canyon Records. In 1995, he released his first compilation album, Greatest Hits: Dedicated to You. The same year, Page recorded a duet with Tiffany, "Close Our Eyes", for her album, All the Best. His next studio album, Loving You, was released in 1996, containing a duet with Amy Mastura titled "The Best Part" as well as a cover of John Waite's 1984 hit "Missing You". Ten 'Til Midnight, released in 2000, was only available for sale online. In 2003, Page released a DVD collection of his music videos, which was sold through his website. Page was one of the producers on Tennessee Girl's album Guilty Pleasures.

In 2011, after a successful stint as an executive at Warner Bros. Records, where he helped to shape the careers of Michael Bublé, Alanis Morissette, Josh Groban, and Green Day, among others, he joined Billboard magazine as a publisher. In that position, he created new features such as the Industry Icon Award as well as the infamous Power 100 List. In April 2013, Page joined Pandora Internet Media as head of music partnerships. In 2015, Page released a single titled "I Break Down 2015", a slower version of his 1990 song of the same name. In June 2016, Page released an 18-track album of his greatest ballads titled My Favorites, which included the 2015 single, "I Break Down 2015" (with vocals and instrumental version).

== Family ==
Page was married to his husband, Charlie, with whom he shared three children.

== Death ==
Page died on March 3, 2017, in an apparent suicide in East Stroudsburg, Pennsylvania. The reasoning behind his suicide is still unknown.

== Discography ==
Tommy Page discography
- Studio albums: 7
- Extended plays: 1
- Compilation albums: 2
- Singles: 15
- Video albums: 2
- Music videos: 17

=== Studio albums ===
Year	Title	Album details	Peak chart positions	
Year	Title	Album details	US	CAN
1988	Tommy Page	Label: Sire Records; Formats: LP, K7, CD	166	—
1990	Paintings in My Mind	Label: Sire Records; Formats: LP, K7, CD	38	37
1991	From the Heart	Label: Sire Records; Formats: LP, K7, CD	192	—
1992	A Friend to Rely on	Label: Sire Records; Formats: LP, K7, CD	—	—
1994	Time	Label: Canyon International; Formats: LP, K7, CD	—	—
1996	Loving You	Label: Canyon International; Formats: CD	—	—
2000	Ten 'Til Midnight	Label: Independent; Formats: CD	—	—

=== Compilation albums ===
Year	Title	Album details
2000	Greatest Hits: Dedicated to You	Label: Sire Records; Formats: K7, CD
2016	My Favorites	Label: Independent; Formats: CD

=== EPs ===
Year	Album
1990	Republic of Idols (R.O.I.)

=== Singles ===
Year	Title	Peak chart positions				Certifications	Album
Year	Title	US	US DAN	CAN	UK	Certifications	Album
1988	"The Shag"	—	—	—	—		Shag (soundtrack)
1988	"Turning Me On"	—	—	—	—		Tommy Page
1988	"A Shoulder to Cry On"	29	—	—	—		Tommy Page
1988	"I Think I'm in Love"	—	—	—	—		Tommy Page
1989	"A Zillion Kisses"	—	45	—	—		Tommy Page
1990	"I'll Be Your Everything"	1	—	5	53	RIAA: Gold	Paintings in My Mind
1990	"Turn On the Radio"	—	—	—	—		Paintings in My Mind
1990	"When I Dream of You"	42	—	79	—		Paintings in My Mind
1990	"You Make Christmas Feel Like Heaven"	—	—	—	—		Non-album single
1991	"Whenever You Close Your Eyes"	—	—	—	—		From the Heart
1991	"Under the Rainbow"	—	—	—	—		From the Heart
1991	"My Shining Star"	—	—	—	—		From the Heart
1994	"Tell the World"	—	—	—	—		Time
1995	"Close Our Eyes" (with Tiffany)	—	—	—	—		All the Best (Tiffany)
2015	"I Break Down 2015"	—	—	—	—		Non-album single

=== Soundtrack, guest, and compilation appearances ===
Year	Song	Appearance on
1989	"The Shag"	Shag (soundtrack)
1989	"Never Had It So Good"	Cookie (soundtrack)
1990	"Blue Nights"	Dick Tracy (soundtrack)
1992	"Stephanie"	Episode 5.16 of Full House

== Videography ==
=== Music videos ===
- "The Shag"
- "A Zillion Kisses"
- "A Shoulder to Cry on"
- "Turning Me On"
- "I'll Be Your Everything"
- "Turn on the Radio"
- "When I Dream of You"
- "Whenever You Close Your Eyes"
- "Madly in Love"
- "Under the Rainbow"
- "Heaven in Your Eyes"
- "I'm Always Dreaming of You" (featuring Sally Yeh)
- "Time"
- "Places in My Heart"
- "The Best Part (feat. Amy Mastura)"
- "Missing You"
- "I Break Down 2015"

=== Video albums ===
- I'll Be Your Everything Videos (1990)
- Tommy Page: The Video Collection (2003)
