= Colby O =

Studio album by Colby O'Donis
- Released: September 16, 2008
- Recorded: 2007–08
- Studios: Konkast Studios (Atlanta); Future Icon Studios (West Hollywood); Record Plant (Los Angeles); Triangle Sound Studios (Atlanta); For O'Reel Studios (Beverly Hills)
- Length: 54:56
- Labels: Kon Live; Geffen
- Producers: Akon; Colby O'Donis; Kay-Ta Matsuno; Christopher "Tricky" Stewart; T-Pain; Giorgio Tuinfort; JB & Corron

Singles from Colby O
- 1. "What You Got" Released: February 26, 2008; 2. "Don't Turn Back" Released: June 24, 2008; 3. "Let You Go" Released: February 17, 2009

Colby O is the only studio album by American singer Colby O'Donis. It was released on September 16, 2008, through Akon's record label Kon Live and Geffen Records. The album was produced by Akon, O'Donis, Clinton Sparks, Giorgio Tuinfort, T-Pain, The-Dream and Tricky Stewart; as well the record features guest appearances from Akon, Lil Romeo, Paul Wall and T-Pain. The album spawned three singles: "What You Got", "Don't Turn Back" and "Let You Go".

The album garnered mixed reviews from critics. Colby O debuted at numbers 41 and 14 on both the US Billboard 200 and the Top R&B/Hip-Hop Albums charts respectively.

== Background ==
Akon served as executive producer and co-wrote 10 tracks with O'Donis (Colby wrote or co-wrote 14 of the 15), and produced eight tracks, including "What You Got." O'Donis produced another four and together they produced one. In an interview, O'Donis mentioned to have worked with many African producers including South African producer SpineCracker. O'Donis commented on the writing process as "writing my own songs is extremely important to me. I feel that I've gone through so much in my life and there's no better way of showing the real you than through music. It's a way for me and my fans to connect through the same struggles. There's so much more of me that I haven't revealed and music is my way of letting people know who I am." According to O'Donis, he and Akon had recorded around forty songs for the album and "it was hard to get it down to a manageable number." O'Donis got inspirations from "girls" and "life in general, past experiences and feelings I've gone through."

Colby O includes the Top 40 song "What You Got" featuring Akon and other singles "Don't Turn Back" and "Let You Go". Other guest appearances include T-Pain, Lil Romeo, and Paul Wall. In addition, the O'Donis plays guitar on the album, as well as bass, drums, percussion, synthesizer and keyboards. According to Colby, his album took three years to make because he wanted every song to be a single. As of December 2008, Colby O has sold 142,751 copies.

== Critical reception ==
Professional ratings
Review scores
Source	Rating
AllMusic	2.5/5 stars
Artistdirect	2/5 stars
DJBooth	3/5 stars

AllMusic's David Jeffries felt that Akon and O'Donis "overstretched" on the "slick R&B" production, critiqued that the latter's vocal delivery over said "well executed but rarely memorable" beats didn't challenge him, and the track listing should've been cut to ten, highlighting "She Wanna Go" and "Under My Nose" as examples. He concluded by gauging the tween audience's reaction to the record: "[T]hey'll find Colby's swagger, his slang dropping, and his smooth voice all very exciting and his hair gel perfectly applied. It's hard to ask for more from such fluff so expect the usual, up to and including the T-Pain guest shot." DJBooth's Nathan Slavik felt that O'Donis' soft vocals worked better on tracks with more "muted production" like "Let You Go", "Under My Nose" and "Follow You" than on "Take You Away" and "The Difference" where they barely register emotion, concluding that "even after listening to Colby O we don't really know who Colby O'Donis is, other than the man filling out the pop/r&b position in Akon's roster. Here's hoping that O'Donis spends until the next album finding his own voice, because if he does we might have a special on our hands."

== Track listing ==
No.	Title	Writer(s)	Producer(s)	Length
1.	"What You Got" (featuring Akon)	Aliaune Thiam, Giorgio Tuinfort	Akon; Tuinfort	4:03
2.	"Sophisticated Bad Girl"	Colby Colon, Kamau Georges, Clinton Sparks, Thiam	Akon; Sparks (co.); Georges (co.)	4:03
3.	"She Wanna Go" (featuring Paul Wall)	Colon, Paul Slayton, Thiam	Akon; O'Donis	3:38
4.	"Let You Go"	Colon, Thiam, Tuinfort	Akon; Tuinfort (co.)	3:35
5.	"Don't Turn Back"	Colon, Georges, Sparks, Thiam	Akon; Sparks (co.); Georges (co.)	4:07
6.	"Under My Nose"	Colon, Thiam, Tuinfort	Akon; Tuinfort (co.)	3:43
7.	"Take You Away" (featuring Lil' Romeo)	Colon, Percy Miller, Jr.	O'Donis	3:34
8.	"Natural High" (featuring T-Pain)	Colon, David Balfour, Frank Romano, Thiam, Faheem Najm	Akon; T-Pain	3:19
9.	"Saved You Money"	Colon	O'Donis	3:03
10.	"Thinking About Ya"	Colon, Derrund Moore, Sparks, Thiam	Akon; Sparks (co.); Tombstone (co.)	3:49
11.	"Tell Me This"	Colon, Teamer	O'Donis; Alex Teamer (co.)	3:53
12.	"Game for You"	Colon, Kay-Ta Matsuno	O'Donis; Matsuno	3:24
13.	"Follow You"	Colon, Moore, Sparks, Thiam	Akon; Sparks (co.); Tombstone (co.)	3:33
14.	"The Difference"	Colon, Christopher Stewart, Terius Nash, James Bunton, Corron Ty Cole	JB & Corron; Tricky Stewart; The-Dream (co.)	4:06
15.	"Hustle Man"	Colon, Sigfredo Colon, Thiam	Akon	3:06

Bonus tracks
No.	Title	Writer(s)	Length
16.	"What You Got (Spanish Version)" (featuring Akon)	C. Colon, A. Thiam, G. Tuinfort	4:07
17.	"What You Got (Acoustic)" (featuring Akon)	A. Thiam, G. Tuinfort	4:32

== Personnel ==
Credits adapted from the album's liner notes.

Technical

- Akon – producer (1–6, 8, 10, 13, 15)
- Colby O'Donis – producer (3, 7, 9, 11, 12), mixing (9, 12)
- Tricky Stewart – producer (14)
- Dave Pensado – mixing (2, 5, 7, 10, 11, 13–15)
- Fabian Marsciullo – mixing (8)
- Jaycen Joshua – mixing (2, 5, 7, 10, 11, 13–15)
- Mark "Exit" Goodchild – mixing (1, 3, 4)
- Andrew Weupper – assistant mix engineering (2, 5, 7, 10, 11, 13–15)
- Randy Urbanski – assistant mix engineering (2, 5, 7, 10, 11, 13, 15)
- Kory Aaron – assistant mix engineering (6)
- Justin Pintar – assistant mix engineering (4)
- Glen Pittman – assistant mix engineering (1)
- Chris Bellman – mastering

Musicians

- Colby O'Donis – background vocals (9, 11, 12), guitar (4, 11, 12), bass (11, 12), percussion (11, 12), drums (12), keyboards (12), synths (12), programming (12), additional programming (4, 5, 10)
- Alex Teamer – bass (11), keyboards (11), synths (12)
- David Balfour – keyboard (8)
- Frank Romano – guitar (8)
- Kay-Ta Matsuno – guitar, bass (12)
- Hakim Abdulsamud – additional programming (15)

Imagery

- Slang Inc. – art direction/design
- Christian Lantry – photography
- Meeno, Trevor O'Shana – additional photography

== Charts ==
Chart (2008)	Peak position
US Billboard 200	41
US Top R&B/Hip-Hop Albums (Billboard)	14
