= Jordan Knight (album) =

Studio album by Jordan Knight
- Released: May 25, 1999
- Studio: Flyte Tyme (Minneapolis, Minnesota)
- Genre: Pop; R&B
- Length: 50:16
- Label: Interscope
- Producer: Jordan Knight; Stevie Bensusen; Claudio Cueni; Jimmy Jam; Terry Lewis; Pro J; Robin Thicke; Donnie Wahlberg

Jordan Knight chronology
Jordan Knight (1999)	Jordan Knight Performs New Kids on the Block: The Remix Album (2004)

Singles from Jordan Knight
- 1. "Give It to You" Released: February 16, 1999; 2. "I Could Never Take the Place of Your Man" Released: July 20, 1999

Jordan Knight is the debut album by New Kids on the Block frontman Jordan Knight, released on May 25, 1999, by Interscope Records. Knight co-produced eight of the eleven tracks on the album with help from Jimmy Jam and Terry Lewis and a then unknown Robin Thicke. The album sold over 500,000 copies in the US alone and reached number 29 on the Billboard 200.

== Release ==
The album was released in 1999 at the height of MTV pop culture. The first single, "Give It to You" received heavy radio airplay and rotation on MTV, as well as BET and VH1. The album was certified Gold months after its release.

In Asia, Knight and boy-band 98 Degrees headlined a tour in support of their albums.

== Critical reception ==
Professional ratings
Review scores
Source	Rating
AllMusic	4/5 stars
Entertainment Weekly	C+
Los Angeles Times	3/4 stars

AllMusic's Stephen Thomas Erlewine praised Knight for updating his "smooth urban soul stylings" with various "contemporary sources to create a stylized, fresh sound." He concluded that: "Jordan Knight is not a perfect album -- there's a little bit of filler that weighs down the second half of the record -- but the best moments are surprisingly strong, innovative, and assured: the kind of mainstream music that would be impressive regardless of the source, but it's all the more remarkable considering Knight's teen pop heritage." Marc Weingarten of the Los Angeles Times praised Jimmy Jam & Terry Lewis for adding "sonic sparkle into even the most workmanlike tracks" throughout the album. He concluded that: "Too many ballads spoil the momentum, but this kid has clearly grown into his own man." David Browne, writing for Entertainment Weekly, criticized the record for Knight's "well-bred but bland" vocal performance, the overreliance of samples and remakes throughout the track listing, and the "buttery production" removing any semblance of soul.

== Track listing ==
No.	Title	Writer(s)	Producer(s)	Length
1.	"Give It to You"	James Harris III; Jordan Knight; Terry Lewis; Robin Thicke	Jimmy Jam; Lewis	4:49
2.	"A Different Party"	Harris III; Knight; Lewis; R. Thicke	Jam; Lewis	4:47
3.	"Change My Ways"	Bobby B. Keyes; Thicke	R. Thicke; Knight (co.); Pro J (co.)	4:43
4.	"I Could Never Take the Place of Your Man"	Prince	Knight; R. Thicke	4:05
5.	"Finally Finding Out"	Keyes; Knight; Armand Sabalecco; R. Thicke	Knight; R. Thicke	4:04
6.	"Broken by You"	Harris III; Lewis	Jam; Lewis	4:22
7.	"Don't Run"	Knight; R. Thicke	Knight; R. Thicke; Donnie Wahlberg	4:46
8.	"Separate Ways"	Knight; Alan Thicke; Brennan Thicke; R. Thicke	R. Thicke; Knight (co.)	4:29
9.	"Close My Eyes"	Harris III; Knight; Lewis; R. Thicke	Jam; Lewis	4:14
10.	"When You're Lonely"	Stevie Bensusen; Knight	Bensusen; Claudio Cueni; Knight (co.)	4:45
11.	"Give It to You" (95 South remix)	Harris III; Knight; Lewis; R. Thicke	Jam; Lewis; Cueni (add.); Knight (add.); Artice Bartley (remix); Carlos Spencer (remix)	5:12

European bonus track
No.	Title	Writer(s)	Producer(s)	Length
12.	"Can I Come Over Tonight"	R. Thicke	R. Thicke, Knight (co.)	4:25

Notes

- Credits adapted from liner notes and AllMusic.
- "A Different Party" contains a sample of "Green-Eyed Lady", as performed by Sugarloaf
- "Don't Run" contains a sample of "Shook Ones (Part II)", as performed by Mobb Deep
- "Close My Eyes" contains a sample of "Dust in the Wind", as performed by Kansas

== Personnel ==
Credits adapted from the liner notes

- Jimmy Jam and Terry Lewis – keyboards, synthesizers, drum programming
- Robin Thicke – keyboards, synthesizers, drum programming
- Pro-Jay – keyboards, synthesizers, drum programming
- Claudio Cueni – keyboards, synthesizers, drum programming
- Alex Richbourg – drum programming
- Stokley Williams – percussion
- Armand Sabalecco – bass
- Scott Kennedy – bass
- Big Jim Wright – piano
- Mike Scott – guitar
- Bobby B. Keyes – guitar
- Brion James – guitar
- Tyrone Chase – guitar
- Steve Hodge – engineer, mixing
- Bill Malina – engineer
- Miguel Pessoa – engineer
- Lior Goldenberg – engineer
- Claudio Cueni – engineer
- Will Pyon – engineer
- Mike Tucker – engineer
- Bray Merritt – engineer
- Evan Py – engineer
- Xavier Smith – mixing
- Claudio Cueni – mixing
- Joe Smith – mixing
- Jordan Knight – executive producer
- Miguel Melendez – executive producer
- Facet NY/LA – art direction

== Charts ==
Chart performance for Jordan Knight
Chart (1999)	Peak position
UK Albums (OCC)	135
US Billboard 200	29

== Certifications ==
Certifications for Jordan Knight
Region	Certification	Certified units/sales
United States (RIAA)	Gold	500,000^{^}
^{^} Shipments figures based on certification alone.
