= Jordan Knight =

American pop singer (born 1970)

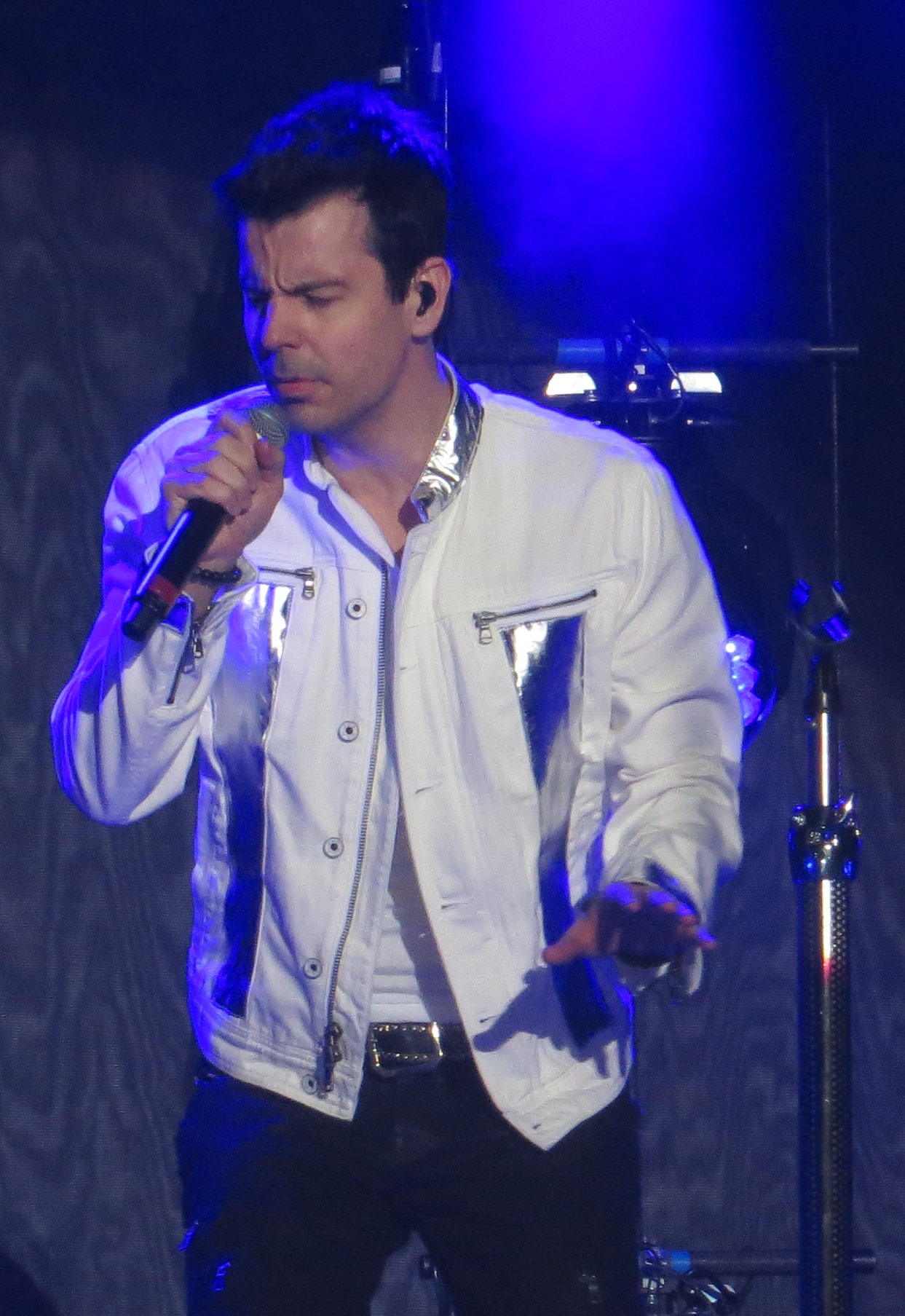
- Knight in 2014

Background information
- Born: Jordan Nathaniel Marcel Knight; May 17, 1970 (age 56); Worcester, Massachusetts, U.S.
- Genres: Pop; R&B
- Occupations: Singer, songwriter
- Years active: 1984–present
- Label: Interscope Records

Jordan Nathaniel Marcel Knight (born May 17, 1970) is an American-Canadian singer and songwriter. He is the lead vocalist of the boy band New Kids on the Block (NKOTB), which rose to fame in the 1980s and 1990s, using a falsetto style of singing influenced by The Stylistics. After New Kids on the Block split in 1994, he launched a solo career.

Knight's first solo album, released in 1999, and his latest solo album, released in 2011, reached the Top 50 on the U.S. Billboard 200. As of 2011, he released four Top 40 singles, the best known being "Give It to You" in 1999. Knight has released three solo albums, one remix album, and one EP. On May 31, 2011, Knight released the studio album, Unfinished. Knight has sold over 1.5 million records worldwide as a solo artist.

== Early life and career ==
Knight was born in Worcester, Massachusetts, the youngest of six children to Canadian parents of English, Scottish and German descent; his father Allan Knight, an Episcopal priest, is from Meaford, Ontario and his mother Marlene (née Putnam) is from Dunnville, Ontario. Consequently, Knight holds dual American and Canadian citizenship. Before achieving fame, he played in a youth baseball league in Dorchester, Massachusetts.

Jordan was almost 14 years old in 1984 when he joined New Kids on the Block, a band assembled in Boston by producer Maurice Starr. His fellow members included his older brother Jonathan, as well as Joey McIntyre, Donnie Wahlberg, and Danny Wood. Over the next few years, he began writing songs and teaching himself piano and keyboard instruments. Starr, who wrote much of the New Kids' material, was reluctant to add his work to the band's repertoire. One night while the band was on tour in 1989, Knight noticed Tommy Page playing piano at a hotel one night and approached him, and the two played piano together for a period of time. Knight played Page a verse from what would become "I'll Be Your Everything", a song that he wanted to save for a future solo project. The two later collaborated on finishing the song, and Page asked if he could record it for his upcoming album. Knight agreed and co-produced the track, and fellow band members Wood and Wahlberg contributed, respectively co-writing and co-producing the song. "I'll Be Your Everything" became a hit single for Page upon its release in February 1990, topping the US Billboard Hot 100 chart for a week that April, spending thirteen weeks in the top 40, and eventually being certified gold by the RIAA.

The group originally disbanded in 1994 but reunited in 2008, scoring 2 top 40 hits and embarking on a successful tour. In the fall of 2010, they teamed with the Backstreet Boys (BSB), creating the boy band NKOTBSB, and toured in summer 2011.

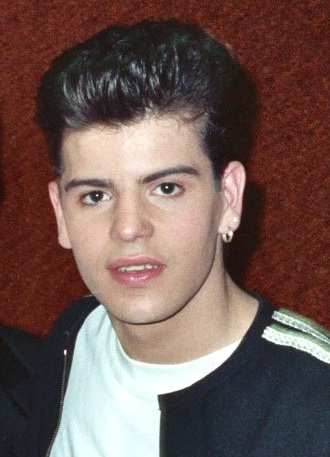
Knight at the 1990 Grammy Awards

New Kids on the Block have sold over 80 million records worldwide, generated hundreds of million of dollars in concert revenues and paved the way for later boy bands like Backstreet Boys and *NSYNC.

== Solo career ==
Knight made a comeback by releasing his first solo single, "Give It To You", on February 16, 1999. The single, produced by Jimmy Jam and Terry Lewis, reached No. 10 on the Billboard Hot 100 and No. 35 on the Hot Dance Music/Club Play chart, went gold, and was nominated for the 1999 MTV Video Music Award for Best Dance Video, though it lost to Ricky Martin's "Livin' La Vida Loca". He was also nominated for Favorite Male Singer at the 2000 Kids' Choice Awards. Knight's self-titled debut album, released on May 25, was certified gold for sales of over 500,000 copies in the US on July 7, 1999. The album peaked at No. 29 on the Billboard 200 and No. 9 on the Top Internet Albums chart, and later won an Aspire Music Award for Best Male Album (Pop).

Knight released a remix album, Jordan Knight Performs New Kids on the Block: The Remix Album, in 2004.

In 2005, Knight released an EP titled The Fix supported by the lead single "Where Is Your Heart Tonight," which reached its peak at No. 12 on the Billboard Adult Contemporary chart. He continued to tour extensively in 2005–2006 promoting the EP.

In September 2006, Knight's next album, Love Songs, was released by Transcontinental Records. The first single was "Say Goodbye," a duet with fellow 1980s pop singer Deborah Gibson, that peaked at No. 24 on the Billboard Adult Contemporary chart.

On May 31, 2011, Knight released his third solo album, Unfinished. The album reached No. 8 on the US Billboard Independent Albums chart, No. 48 on the US Billboard 200 and No. 55 in Canada. He began his Live and Unfinished Tour on December 11, 2011. Knight performed the announced dates with Boston-based band Elevation Theory.

In 2014, Knight teamed up with Nick Carter for the release of the album Nick & Knight, touring throughout the fall of that year to support the album.

== Television ==
Knight was a judge on the American Idol spin-off, American Juniors. He was a third-season cast member on the VH1 reality television series The Surreal Life with other celebrities in 2004, and later appeared in the 2007 spin-off The Surreal Life: Fame Games.

In 2005, Knight appeared on the British show Hit Me Baby One More Time, where he performed "Give It to You," as well as a cover of "Let Me Love You" by Mario.

In September 2005, Knight also starred in a British documentary on Five in the UK called Trust Me – I'm a Holiday Rep. Six celebrities spent 10 days in the role of an Olympic Holidays holiday rep in Ayia Napa, Cyprus.

Knight also appeared on the game show Identity, hosted by Penn Jillette. In September 2011, he featured as a judge on the CBC show Cover Me Canada.

== Personal life ==
Knight has been married to Evelyn Melendez since 2004. They have two sons, Dante Jordan (born August 25, 1999) and Eric Jacob (born February 21, 2007).

Knight lives in Milton, Massachusetts, where in 2016, he became a partner in a local Italian restaurant called Novara.

== Discography ==
Solo albums

- Jordan Knight (1999)
- Jordan Knight Performs New Kids on the Block: The Remix Album (2004)
- Love Songs (2006)
- Unfinished (2011)

Collaborative albums

- Nick & Knight (2014, with Nick Carter)
