= Billboard Year-End Hot Rap Songs of 2013 =

American music chart

This is a list of Billboard magazine's Top Hot Rap Songs of 2013.

No.	Title	Artist(s)
1	"Thrift Shop"	Macklemore & Ryan Lewis featuring Wanz
2	"Can't Hold Us"	Macklemore & Ryan Lewis featuring Ray Dalton
3	"Holy Grail"	Jay-Z featuring Justin Timberlake
4	"Started from the Bottom"	Drake
5	"Feel This Moment"	Pitbull featuring Christina Aguilera
6	"Fuckin' Problems"	ASAP Rocky featuring Drake, 2 Chainz and Kendrick Lamar
7	"Love Me"	Lil Wayne featuring Drake and Future
8	"Power Trip"	J. Cole featuring Miguel
9	"Same Love"	Macklemore & Ryan Lewis featuring Mary Lambert
10	"Bad"	Wale featuring Tiara Thomas
11	"Gangnam Style"	Psy
12	"I Cry"	Flo Rida
13	"Swimming Pools (Drank)"	Kendrick Lamar
14	"Berzerk"	Eminem
15	"U.O.E.N.O."	Rocko featuring Future and Rick Ross
16	"Poetic Justice"	Kendrick Lamar featuring Drake
17	"Bitch, Don't Kill My Vibe"	Kendrick Lamar
18	"Crooked Smile"	J. Cole featuring TLC
19	"I'm Different"	2 Chainz
20	"Bugatti"	Ace Hood featuring Future and Rick Ross
21	"Rich As Fuck"	Lil Wayne featuring 2 Chainz
22	"Don't Stop the Party"	Pitbull featuring TJR
23	"Clique"	Kanye West, Jay-Z and Big Sean
24	"Gas Pedal"	Sage the Gemini featuring Iamsu!
25	"Gentleman"	Psy
26	"23"	Mike Will Made It featuring Miley Cyrus, Wiz Khalifa and Juicy J
27	"No Worries"	Lil Wayne featuring Detail
28	"All Gold Everything"	Trinidad James
29	"No New Friends" (SFTB remix)	DJ Khaled featuring Drake, Rick Ross and Lil Wayne
30	"Bandz a Make Her Dance"	Juicy J featuring Lil Wayne and 2 Chainz
31	"Tapout"	Rich Gang featuring Future
32	"The Monster"	Eminem featuring Rihanna
33	"Beware"	Big Sean featuring Lil Wayne and Jhené Aiko
34	"We Still in This Bitch"	B.o.B featuring T.I. and Juicy J
35	"Red Nose"	Sage the Gemini
36	"Tom Ford"	Jay-Z
37	"Type of Way"	Rich Homie Quan
38	"Neva End"	Future featuring Kelly Rowland
39	"Ball"	T.I. featuring Lil Wayne
40	"R.I.P."	Young Jeezy featuring 2 Chainz
41	"Headband"	B.o.B featuring 2 Chainz
42	"Rap God"	Eminem
43	"Timber"	Pitbull featuring Kesha
44	"My Nigga"	YG featuring Jeezy and Rich Homie Quan
45	"Battle Scars"	Guy Sebastian featuring Lupe Fiasco
46	"Ain't Worried About Nothin'"	French Montana
47	"All Me"	Drake featuring 2 Chainz and Big Sean
48	"High School"	Nicki Minaj featuring Lil Wayne
49	"Don't Drop That Thun Thun"	The Finatticz
50	"Pop That"	French Montana featuring Rick Ross, Drake and Lil Wayne

== See also ==
- 2013 in music
- Billboard Year-End Hot 100 singles of 2013
- Billboard Year-End Hot R&B/Hip-Hop Songs of 2013
- List of Billboard number-one rap singles of 2013
