= Billboard Year-End Hot R&B/Hip-Hop Songs of 2013 =

American music chart

This is a list of Billboard magazine's Top Hot R&B/Hip-Hop Songs of 2013.

No.	Title	Artist(s)
1	"Thrift Shop"	Macklemore & Ryan Lewis featuring Wanz
2	"Blurred Lines"	Robin Thicke featuring T.I. and Pharrell
3	"Can't Hold Us"	Macklemore & Ryan Lewis featuring Ray Dalton
4	"Suit & Tie"	Justin Timberlake featuring Jay-Z
5	"Holy Grail"	Jay-Z featuring Justin Timberlake
6	"Diamonds"	Rihanna
7	"Started from the Bottom"	Drake
8	"Fuckin' Problems"	ASAP Rocky featuring Drake, 2 Chainz and Kendrick Lamar
9	"Hold On, We're Going Home"	Drake featuring Majid Jordan
10	"Love Me"	Lil Wayne featuring Drake and Future
11	"Power Trip"	J. Cole featuring Miguel
12	"Girl on Fire"	Alicia Keys
13	"Same Love"	Macklemore & Ryan Lewis featuring Mary Lambert
14	"Bad"	Wale featuring Tiara Thomas or Rihanna
15	"Adorn"	Miguel
16	"Pour It Up"	Rihanna
17	"Swimming Pools (Drank)"	Kendrick Lamar
18	"Berzerk"	Eminem
19	"Body Party"	Ciara
20	"Bitch, Don't Kill My Vibe"	Kendrick Lamar
21	"U.O.E.N.O."	Rocko featuring Future and Rick Ross
22	"#Beautiful"	Mariah Carey featuring Miguel
23	"Poetic Justice"	Kendrick Lamar featuring Drake
24	"Next to Me"	Emeli Sandé
25	"Crooked Smile"	J. Cole featuring TLC
26	"Bugatti"	Ace Hood featuring Future and Rick Ross
27	"I'm Different"	2 Chainz
28	"Rich As Fuck"	Lil Wayne featuring 2 Chainz
29	"Clique"	Kanye West, Jay-Z and Big Sean
30	"Gas Pedal"	Sage the Gemini featuring Iamsu!
31	"Love More"	Chris Brown featuring Nicki Minaj
32	"23"	Mike Will Made It featuring Miley Cyrus, Wiz Khalifa and Juicy J
33	"Fine China"	Chris Brown
34	"All Gold Everything"	Trinidad James
35	"No New Friends"	DJ Khaled featuring Drake, Rick Ross and Lil Wayne
36	"No Worries"	Lil Wayne featuring Detail
37	"Thinkin Bout You"	Frank Ocean
38	"Bandz a Make Her Dance"	Juicy J
39	"We Still in This Bitch"	Wale
40	"Beware"	Big Sean featuring Lil Wayne and Jhené Aiko
41	"Tapout"	Rich Gang featuring Future
42	"The Monster"	Eminem featuring Rihanna
43	"Type of Way"	Rich Homie Quan
44	"Take Back the Night"	Justin Timberlake
45	"Give It 2 U"	Robin Thicke featuring Kendrick Lamar
46	"Red Nose"	Sage the Gemini
47	"Wicked Games"	The Weeknd
48	"Loveeeeeee Song"	Rihanna featuring Future
49	"Tom Ford"	Jay-Z
50	"Beat It"	Sean Kingston featuring Chris Brown and Wiz Khalifa
51	"Neva End"	Future
52	"R.I.P."	Young Jeezy featuring 2 Chainz
53	"Love and War"	Tamar Braxton
54	"Battle Scars"	Guy Sebastian and Lupe Fiasco
55	"Headband"	B.o.B featuring 2 Chainz
56	"How Many Drinks?"	Miguel featuring Kendrick Lamar
57	"Ball"	T.I. featuring Lil Wayne
58	"Don't Drop That Thun Thun"	The Finatticz
59	"Ain't Worried About Nothin'"	French Montana
60	"I Luv This Shit"	August Alsina featuring Trinidad James
61	"Feds Watching"	2 Chainz featuring Pharrell
62	"High School"	Nicki Minaj featuring Lil Wayne
63	"My Nigga"	YG featuring Jeezy and Rich Homie Quan
64	"Love Sosa"	Chief Keef
65	"Rap God"	Eminem
66	"We Own It (Fast & Furious)"	2 Chainz and Wiz Khalifa
67	"Kisses Down Low"	Kelly Rowland
68	"Who Booty"	Jonn Hart featuring Iamsu!
69	"Don't Judge Me"	Chris Brown
70	"Wild for the Night"	ASAP Rocky featuring Skrillex and Birdy Nam Nam
71	"All Me"	Drake featuring 2 Chainz and Big Sean
72	"Karate Chop"	Future featuring Lil Wayne
73	"FuckWithMeYouKnowIGotIt"	Jay-Z featuring Rick Ross
74	"TKO"	Justin Timberlake
75	"Pop That"	French Montana featuring Rick Ross, Drake and Lil Wayne
76	"Molly"	Tyga featuring Cedric Gervais, Wiz Khalifa and Mally Mall
77	"Bounce It"	Juicy J featuring Wale and Trey Songz
78	"Guap"	Big Sean
79	"Remember You"	Wiz Khalifa featuring The Weeknd
80	"Survival"	Eminem
81	"White Walls"	Macklemore & Ryan Lewis featuring Schoolboy Q and Hollis
82	"Honest"	Future
83	"Without Me"	Fantasia featuring Kelly Rowland and Missy Elliott
84	"Ready"	Fabolous featuring Chris Brown
85	"Dope"	Tyga featuring Rick Ross
86	"Memories Back Then"	T.I. featuring B.o.B, Kendrick Lamar and Kris Stephens
87	"Birthday Song"	2 Chainz featuring Kanye West
88	"The One"	Tamar Braxton
89	"Show Out"	Juicy J featuring Big Sean and Young Jeezy
90	"It Won't Stop"	Sevyn Streeter featuring Chris Brown
91	"Bubble Butt"	Major Lazer featuring Bruno Mars, 2 Chainz, Tyga and Mystic
92	"Mercy"	Kanye West featuring Big Sean, Pusha T and 2 Chainz
93	"V.S.O.P."	K. Michelle
94	"No Lie"	2 Chainz featuring Drake
95	"Freaks"	French Montana featuring Nicki Minaj
96	"Work"	ASAP Ferg
97	"LoveHate Thing"	Wale featuring Sam Dew
98	"I'm Out"	Ciara featuring Nicki Minaj
99	"Versace"	Migos
100	"Celebration"	Game featuring Chris Brown, Tyga, Wiz Khalifa and Lil Wayne

== See also ==
- 2013 in music
- Billboard Year-End Hot 100 singles of 2013
- Billboard Year-End Hot Rap Songs of 2013
- List of number-one R&B singles of 2013 (U.S.)
