= Billboard Year-End Hot 100 singles of 2013 =

Ranking of recorded music

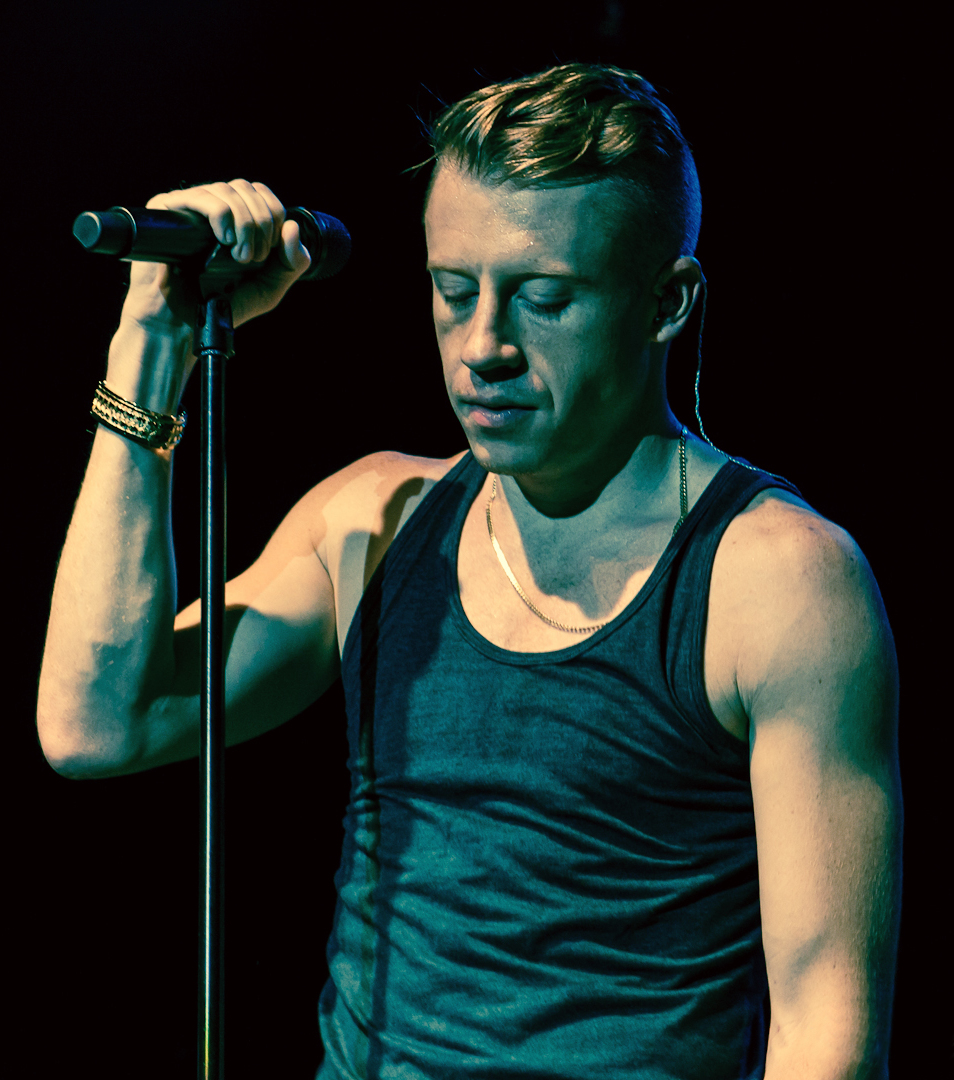
"Thrift Shop" from rapper Macklemore and producer Ryan Lewis featuring Wanz came in at number one, spending a total of six nonconsecutive weeks.

The Billboard Hot 100 is a chart that ranks the best-performing singles of the United States. Its data, published by Billboard magazine and compiled by Nielsen SoundScan, is based collectively on each single's weekly physical and digital sales, as well as airplay and streaming. Throughout a year, Billboard will publish an annual list of the 100 most successful songs throughout that year on the Hot 100 chart based on the information. For 2013, the list was published on December 13, calculated with data from December 1, 2012, to November 30, 2013.

"Thrift Shop" by Macklemore and Ryan Lewis featuring Wanz topped the Year-End Hot 100 chart, with a total of 7,208,000 copies sold in the US. Macklemore and Ryan Lewis's single "Can't Hold Us" featuring Ray Dalton also appeared in the list at number five, making the duo the fourth act to have two singles in the top five of the Year-End Hot 100 list. The second best-selling single of 2013 was "Blurred Lines" by Robin Thicke featuring T.I. and Pharrell, having sold 6,380,000 copies in the country. Meanwhile, "Radioactive" by Imagine Dragons and "Harlem Shake" by Baauer was listed on the list at number three and four, respectively.

== List ==
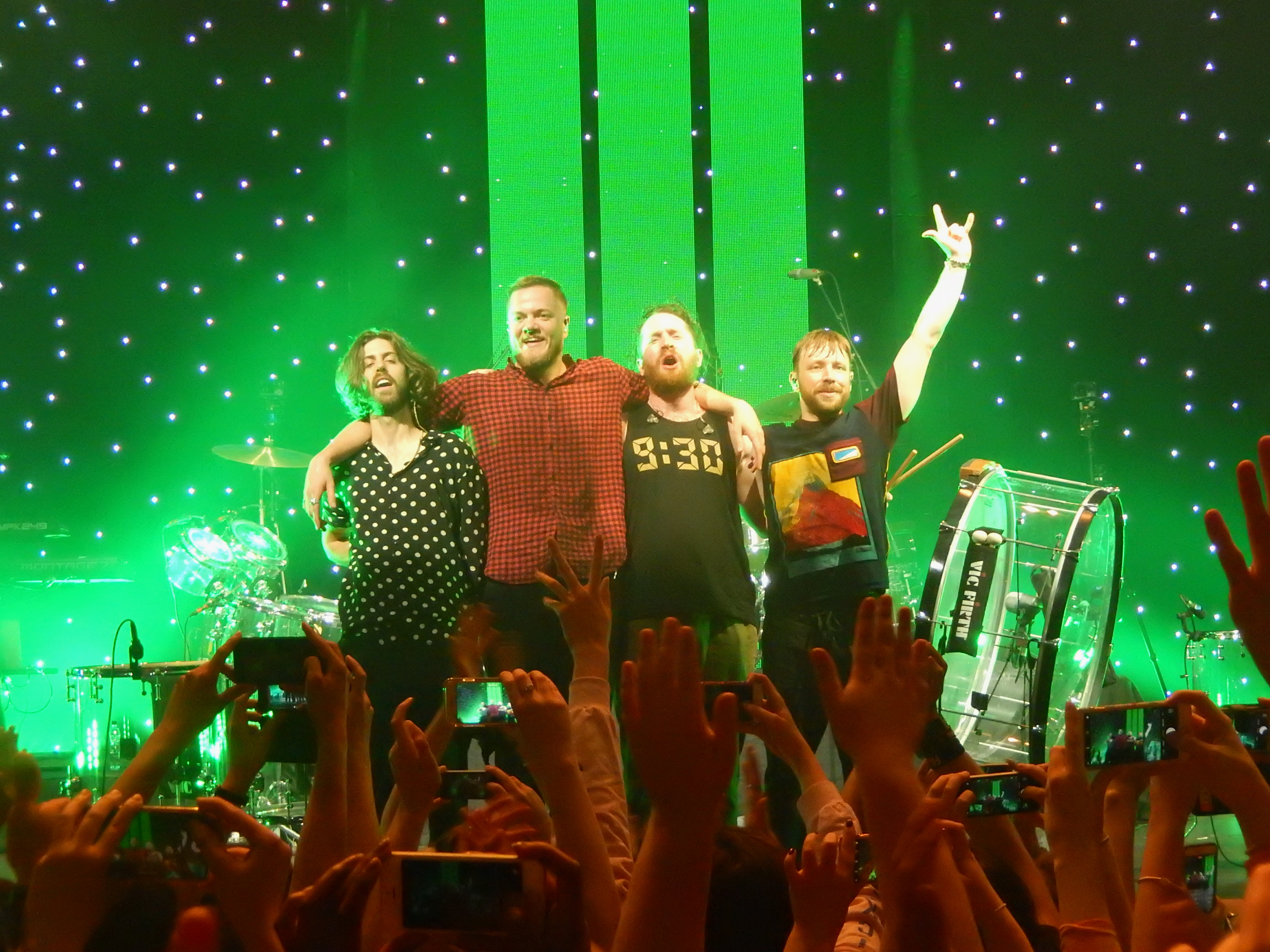
Indie rock band Imagine Dragons has three singles on the list, one of them being "Radioactive", their highest-charting single on the list.

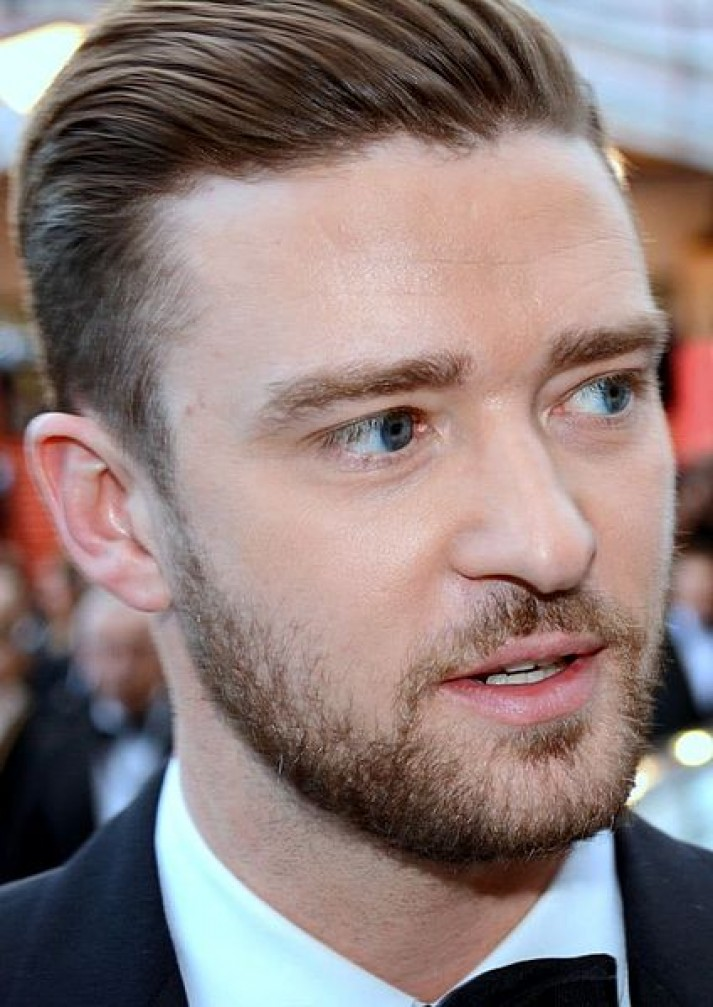
Justin Timberlake has three singles in the Top 25, two of which are his own songs, with "Mirrors" at number 6 and "Suit & Tie" at number 20.

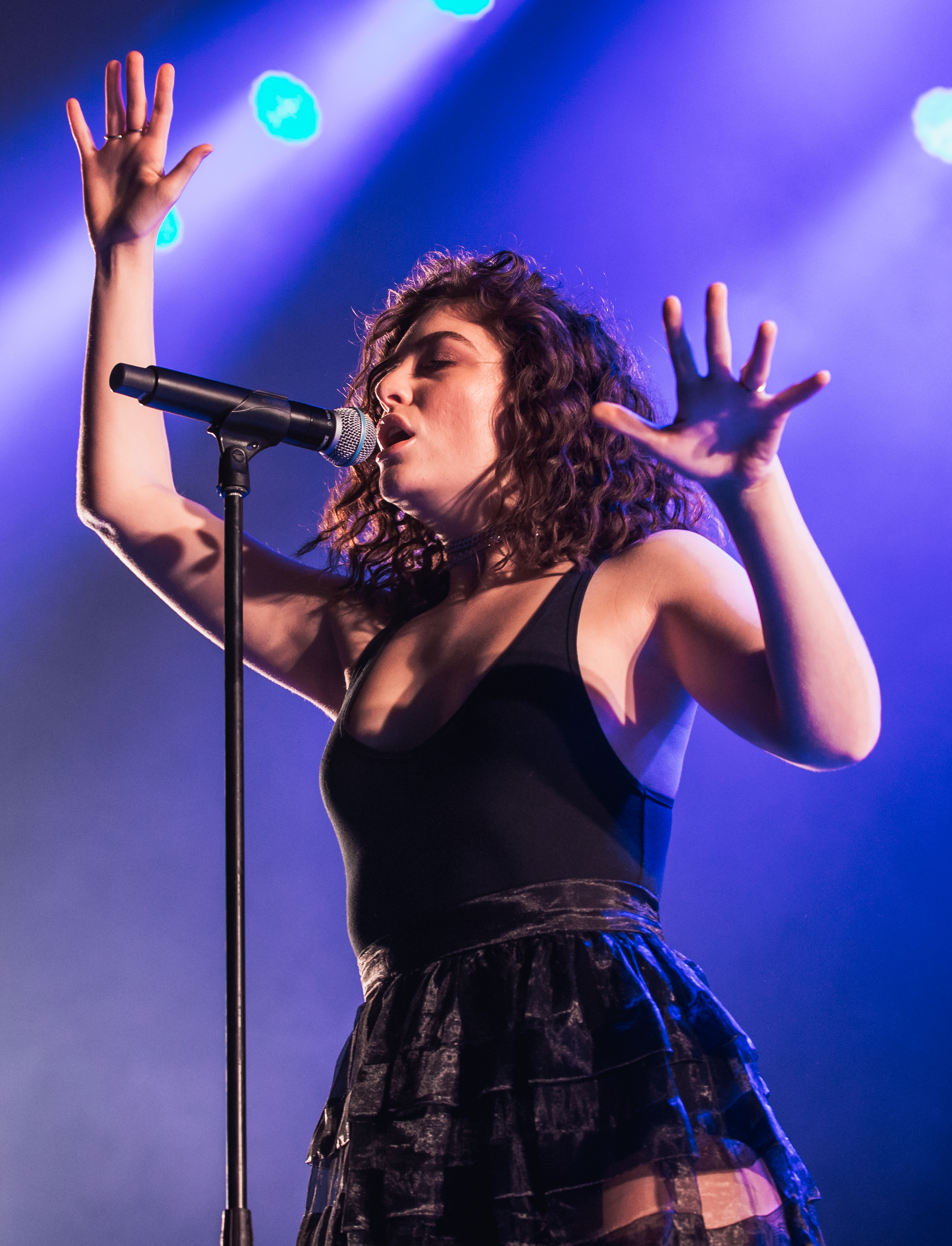
Lorde's single "Royals" is at number 15 as it peaked at number one for nine consecutive weeks at the Hot 100, making her the youngest artist to reach number one since Tiffany's "I Think We're Alone Now".

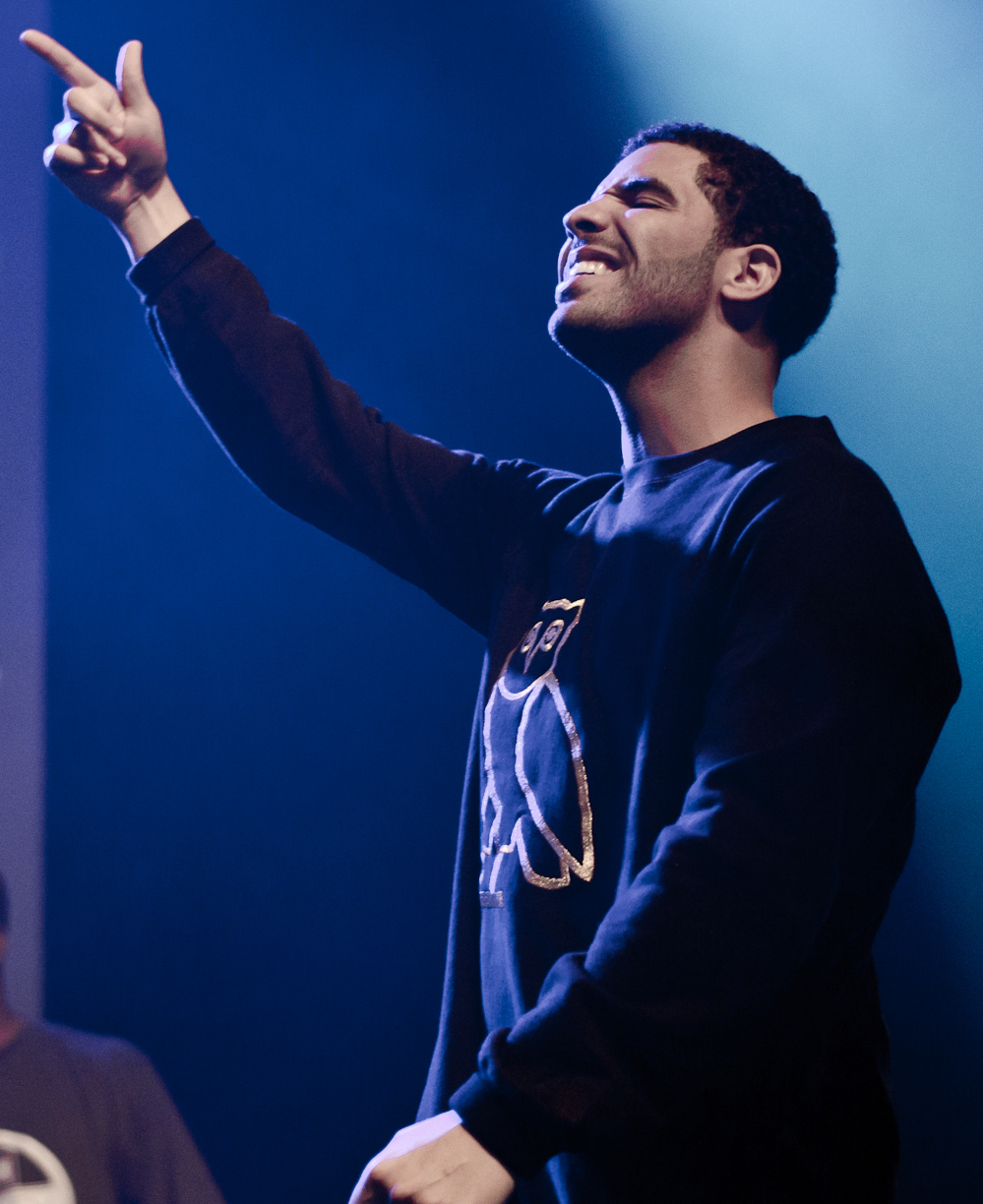
Drake has four singles in the Top 50. Two of them are his own singles, with "Started From the Bottom" at number 32 and "Hold On, We're Going Home" at number 34, while the other two features him as a guest rapper, with Lil Wayne's "Love Me" at number 39 and A$AP Rocky's "Fuckin' Problems" at number 41.

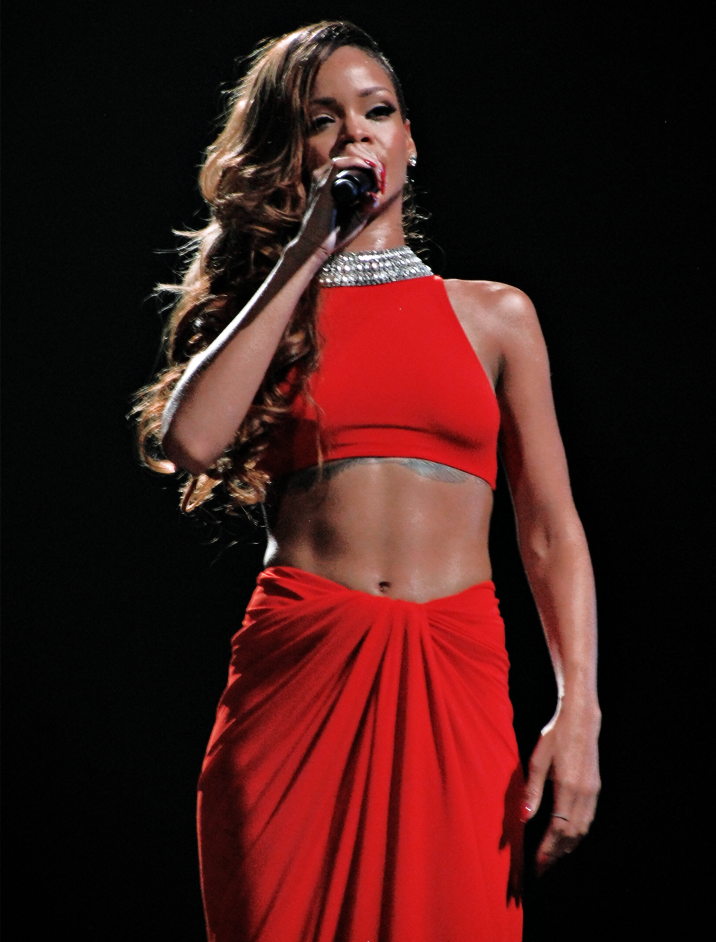
Rihanna has four singles on the list with "Stay" featuring Mikky Ekko at number 13, "Diamonds" at number 27, "Bad" with Wale at number 59, and "Pour It Up" at number 70.

List of songs on Billboard's 2013 Year-End Hot 100 chart
No.	Title	Artist(s)
1	"Thrift Shop"	Macklemore & Ryan Lewis featuring Wanz
2	"Blurred Lines"	Robin Thicke featuring T.I. and Pharrell Williams
3	"Radioactive"	Imagine Dragons
4	"Harlem Shake"	Baauer
5	"Can't Hold Us"	Macklemore & Ryan Lewis featuring Ray Dalton
6	"Mirrors"	Justin Timberlake
7	"Just Give Me a Reason"	Pink featuring Nate Ruess
8	"When I Was Your Man"	Bruno Mars
9	"Cruise"	Florida Georgia Line featuring Nelly
10	"Roar"	Katy Perry
11	"Locked Out of Heaven"	Bruno Mars
12	"Ho Hey"	The Lumineers
13	"Stay"	Rihanna featuring Mikky Ekko
14	"Get Lucky"	Daft Punk featuring Pharrell Williams
15	"Royals"	Lorde
16	"I Knew You Were Trouble"	Taylor Swift
17	"We Can't Stop"	Miley Cyrus
18	"Wrecking Ball"	Miley Cyrus
19	"Wake Me Up"	Avicii
20	"Suit & Tie"	Justin Timberlake featuring Jay-Z
21	"Cups (Pitch Perfect's When I'm Gone)"	Anna Kendrick
22	"Holy Grail"	Jay-Z featuring Justin Timberlake
23	"Scream & Shout"	Will.i.am featuring Britney Spears
24	"Clarity"	Zedd featuring Foxes
25	"Sail"	Awolnation
26	"Don't You Worry Child"	Swedish House Mafia featuring John Martin
27	"Diamonds"	Rihanna
28	"I Love It"	Icona Pop featuring Charli XCX
29	"Safe and Sound"	Capital Cities
30	"Treasure"	Bruno Mars
31	"The Way"	Ariana Grande featuring Mac Miller
32	"Started from the Bottom"	Drake
33	"Come & Get It"	Selena Gomez
34	"Hold On, We're Going Home"	Drake featuring Majid Jordan
35	"Daylight"	Maroon 5
36	"Feel This Moment"	Pitbull featuring Christina Aguilera
37	"Applause"	Lady Gaga
38	"One More Night"	Maroon 5
39	"Love Me"	Lil Wayne featuring Drake and Future
40	"My Songs Know What You Did in the Dark (Light Em Up)"	Fall Out Boy
41	"Fuckin' Problems"	ASAP Rocky featuring Drake, 2 Chainz and Kendrick Lamar
42	"Beauty and a Beat"	Justin Bieber featuring Nicki Minaj
43	"Same Love"	Macklemore & Ryan Lewis featuring Mary Lambert
44	"Sweet Nothing"	Calvin Harris featuring Florence Welch
45	"Summertime Sadness"	Lana Del Rey and Cédric Gervais
46	"Home"	Phillip Phillips
47	"It's Time"	Imagine Dragons
48	"Power Trip"	J. Cole featuring Miguel
49	"Girl on Fire"	Alicia Keys featuring Nicki Minaj
50	"Heart Attack"	Demi Lovato
51	"Love Somebody"	Maroon 5
52	"I Will Wait"	Mumford & Sons
53	"Try"	Pink
54	"Wagon Wheel"	Darius Rucker
55	"Gangnam Style"	Psy
56	"I Need Your Love"	Calvin Harris featuring Ellie Goulding
57	"Die Young"	Kesha
58	"Some Nights"	Fun
59	"Bad"	Wale featuring Tiara Thomas or Rihanna
60	"Boys 'Round Here"	Blake Shelton featuring Pistol Annies and Friends
61	"Gone, Gone, Gone"	Phillip Phillips
62	"Demons"	Imagine Dragons
63	"Counting Stars"	OneRepublic
64	"I Cry"	Flo Rida
65	"Little Talks"	Of Monsters and Men
66	"The Other Side"	Jason Derulo
67	"Berzerk"	Eminem
68	"Catch My Breath"	Kelly Clarkson
69	"Crash My Party"	Luke Bryan
70	"Pour It Up"	Rihanna
71	"22"	Taylor Swift
72	"I Want Crazy"	Hunter Hayes
73	"The Fox (What Does the Fox Say?)"	Ylvis
74	"Best Song Ever"	One Direction
75	"The A Team"	Ed Sheeran
76	"Carry On"	Fun
77	"Highway Don't Care"	Tim McGraw featuring Taylor Swift and Keith Urban
78	"That's My Kind of Night"	Luke Bryan
79	"Swimming Pools (Drank)"	Kendrick Lamar
80	"Sure Be Cool If You Did"	Blake Shelton
81	"#Beautiful"	Mariah Carey featuring Miguel
82	"Troublemaker"	Olly Murs featuring Flo Rida
83	"Body Party"	Ciara
84	"Adorn"	Miguel
85	"Hall of Fame"	The Script featuring will.i.am
86	"Let Me Love You (Until You Learn to Love Yourself)"	Ne-Yo
87	"U.O.E.N.O."	Rocko featuring Future and Rick Ross
88	"Next to Me"	Emeli Sandé
89	"Mama's Broken Heart"	Miranda Lambert
90	"It Goes Like This"	Thomas Rhett
91	"Bugatti"	Ace Hood featuring Future and Rick Ross
92	"Wanted"	Hunter Hayes
93	"Downtown"	Lady Antebellum
94	"Get Your Shine On"	Florida Georgia Line
95	"#thatPower"	will.i.am featuring Justin Bieber
96	"Brave"	Sara Bareilles
97	"Let Her Go"	Passenger
98	"Runnin' Outta Moonlight"	Randy Houser
99	"I'm Different"	2 Chainz
100	"Still Into You"	Paramore

== See also ==
- 2013 in American music
- Billboard Year-End Hot R&B/Hip-Hop Songs of 2013
- Billboard Year-End Hot Rap Songs of 2013
- List of Billboard Hot 100 number-one singles of 2013
- List of Billboard Hot 100 top-ten singles in 2013
