= List of Billboard Hot 100 top-ten singles in 2013 =

This is a list of singles that charted in the top ten of the Billboard Hot 100, an all-genre singles chart, in 2013.

During the year, 62 songs and 59 acts charted in the tier, and 34 of these acts scored their first top-ten single in the US either as a lead or featured artist. Drake had the most top tens in 2013, with four, while Lorde's debut single "Royals" became the longest-running top-ten single of the year, spending twenty-three consecutive weeks in the tier. Macklemore and Ryan Lewis spent the most consecutive weeks in the top ten during 2013, with thirty-two spanning from January 5 to August 10.

== Top-ten singles ==
Key

- ↑ – indicates single's top 10 entry was also its Hot 100 debut
- † – indicates Best performing song of the year
- (#) – 2013 year-end top 10 single position and rank
- The "weeks in top ten" column reflects each song's entire chart life, not just its run during 2013.

List of Billboard Hot 100 top ten singles which peaked in 2013
Top ten entry date	Single	Artist(s)	Peak	Peak date	Weeks in top ten	References
Singles from 2012
June 9	"Home" ↑	Phillip Phillips	6	January 19	13	
October 27	"I Knew You Were Trouble" ↑	Taylor Swift	2	January 12	16	
December 22	"Beauty and a Beat"	Justin Bieber featuring Nicki Minaj	5	January 5	10	
Singles from 2013
January 5	"Thrift Shop" † (#1)	Macklemore & Ryan Lewis featuring Wanz	1	February 2	21	
January 19	"Scream & Shout"	will.i.am and Britney Spears	3	February 16	11	
January 26	"Don't You Worry Child"^{[D]}	Swedish House Mafia featuring John Martin	6	February 9	6	
February 2	"Suit & Tie"^{[C]}	Justin Timberlake featuring Jay-Z	3	April 6	13	
February 9	"Fuckin' Problems"	ASAP Rocky featuring Drake, 2 Chainz and Kendrick Lamar	8	February 16	2	
February 16	"Sweet Nothing"	Calvin Harris featuring Florence Welch	10	February 16	1	
February 16	"Try"	Pink	9	February 16	1	
February 23	"Daylight"	Maroon 5	7	February 23	1	
February 23	"When I Was Your Man" (#8)	Bruno Mars	1	April 20	16	
March 2	"Harlem Shake" (#4) ↑	Baauer	1	March 2	8	
March 2	"Started from the Bottom"	Drake	6	March 9	10	
March 2	"Stay"	Rihanna featuring Mikky Ekko	3	March 2	16	
March 9	"Love Me"^{[E]}	Lil Wayne featuring Future and Drake	9	March 23	4	
March 30	"Just Give Me a Reason" (#7)	Pink featuring Nate Ruess	1	April 27	15	
April 6	"Feel This Moment"	Pitbull featuring Christina Aguilera	8	April 6	7	
April 13	"The Way" ↑^{[H]}^{[I]}	Ariana Grande featuring Mac Miller	9	June 22	4	
April 13	"Radioactive" (#3) ^{[F]}	Imagine Dragons	3	July 6	20	
April 20	"Can't Hold Us" (#5)	Macklemore and Ryan Lewis featuring Ray Dalton	1	May 18	17	
April 20	"Cruise (Remix)" (#9) ^{[G]}	Florida Georgia Line featuring Nelly	4	July 6	14	
April 27	"Heart Attack"	Demi Lovato	10	April 27	1	
April 27	"Mirrors" (#6)	Justin Timberlake	2	June 15	15	
May 4	"Gentleman"	Psy	5	May 4	1	
May 11	"I Love It"	Icona Pop featuring Charli XCX	7	May 18	8	
May 25	"Come & Get It"	Selena Gomez	6	May 25	9	
June 1	"Get Lucky"	Daft Punk featuring Pharrell Williams	2	June 29	15	
June 15	"Blurred Lines" (#2)	Robin Thicke featuring T.I. and Pharrell Williams	1	June 22	21	
July 6	"Treasure"	Bruno Mars	5	August 3	9	
July 6	"We Can't Stop"	Miley Cyrus	2	August 3	11	
July 20	"Cups (Pitch Perfect's "When I'm Gone")"	Anna Kendrick	6	August 17	7	
July 27	"Holy Grail" ↑	Jay-Z featuring Justin Timberlake	4	September 21	16	
August 10	"Best Song Ever" ↑	One Direction	2	August 10	1	
August 17	"Clarity"	Zedd featuring Foxes	8	August 17	2	
August 17	"Love Somebody"	Maroon 5	10	August 17	2	
August 17	"Safe and Sound"^{[J]}^{[K]}	Capital Cities	8	September 7	6	
August 31	"Applause" ↑	Lady Gaga	4	September 7	14	
August 31	"Roar" (#10)	Katy Perry	1	September 14	17	
September 7	"Summertime Sadness (Remix)"	Lana Del Rey featuring Cedric Gervais	6	September 21	8	
September 7	"Wake Me Up!"	Avicii	4	October 5	21	
September 14	"Berzerk" ↑	Eminem	3	September 14	3	
September 14	"Royals"	Lorde	1	October 12	23	
September 21	"Hold On, We're Going Home"^{[L]}	Drake featuring Majid Jordan	4	October 12	13	
September 28	"Wrecking Ball"	Miley Cyrus	1	September 28	16	
October 12	"The Fox (What Does the Fox Say?)"	Ylvis	6	October 19	5	
November 2	"Rap God" ↑	Eminem	7	November 2	1	
November 9	"Demons"	Imagine Dragons	6	December 7	12	
November 16	"The Monster" ↑	Eminem featuring Rihanna	1	December 21	13	
November 16	"Story of My Life" ↑^{[M]}	One Direction	6	November 16	7	
November 23	"Dope" ↑	Lady Gaga	8	November 23	1	
December 14	"Say Something"	A Great Big World and Christina Aguilera	4	December 28	14	

=== 2012 peaks ===
List of Billboard Hot 100 top ten singles in 2013 which peaked in 2012
Top ten entry date	Single	Artist(s)	Peak	Peak date	Weeks in top ten	References
September 1	"One More Night"	Maroon 5	1	September 29	21	
October 6	"Gangnam Style"^{[A]}	Psy	2	October 6	12	
October 27	"Die Young"	Kesha	2	December 8	12	
November 3	"Diamonds"	Rihanna	1	December 1	15	
November 10	"Locked Out of Heaven"	Bruno Mars	1	December 22	20	
November 24	"I Cry"^{[B]}	Flo Rida	6	December 22	9	
December 1	"Ho Hey"	The Lumineers	3	December 29	14	

=== 2014 peaks ===
List of Billboard Hot 100 top ten singles in 2013 which peaked in 2014
Top ten entry date	Single	Artist(s)	Peak	Peak date	Weeks in top ten	References
November 9	"Counting Stars"	OneRepublic	2	January 18	25	
November 30	"Timber"	Pitbull featuring Kesha	1	January 18	17	
December 7	"Let Her Go"^{[L]}	Passenger	5	February 22	12	

== Artists with most top-ten songs ==
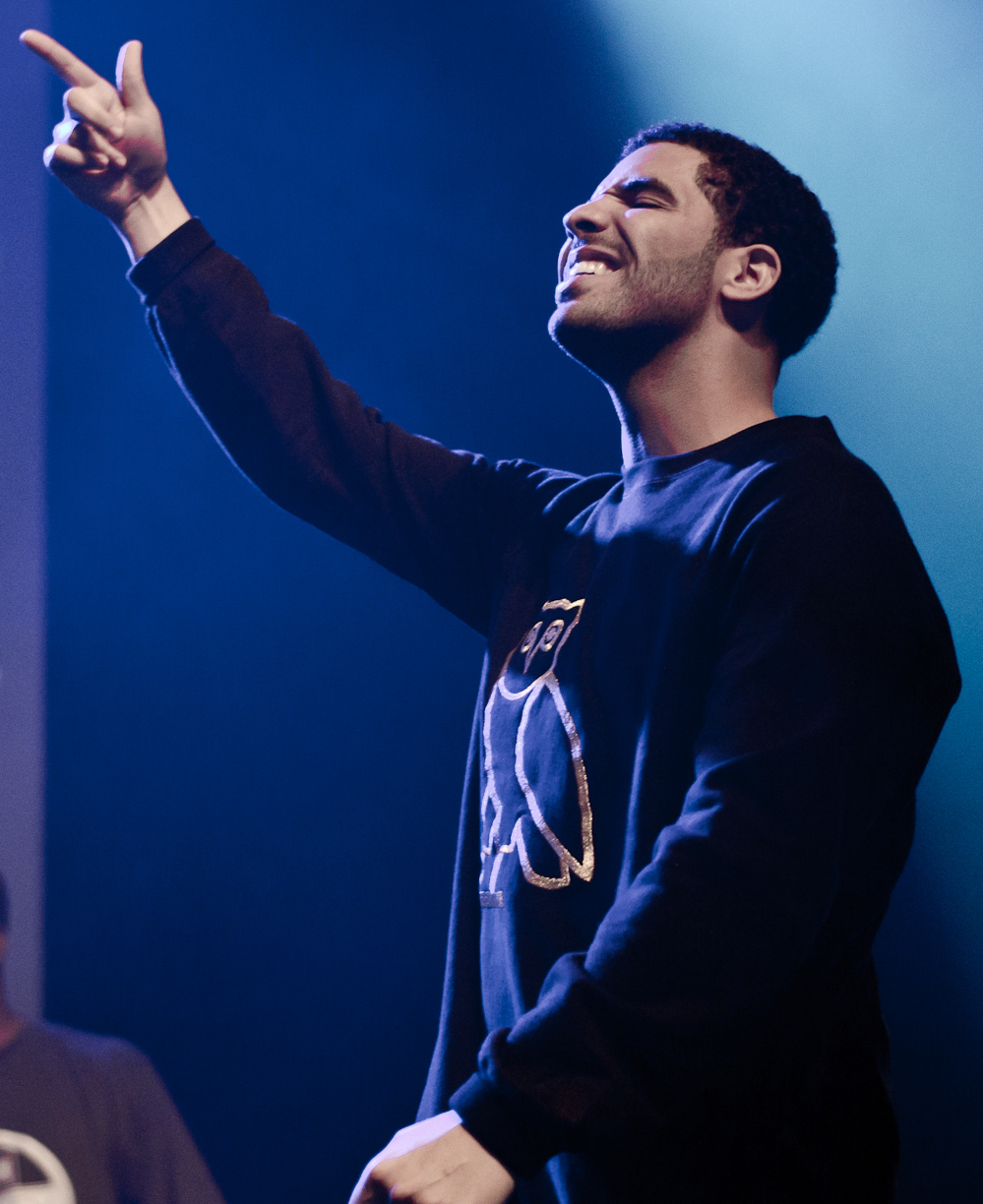
Drake scored the most top ten hits in 2013 with four, including "Fuckin' Problems", "Started from the Bottom", "Love Me" and "Hold On, We're Going Home".

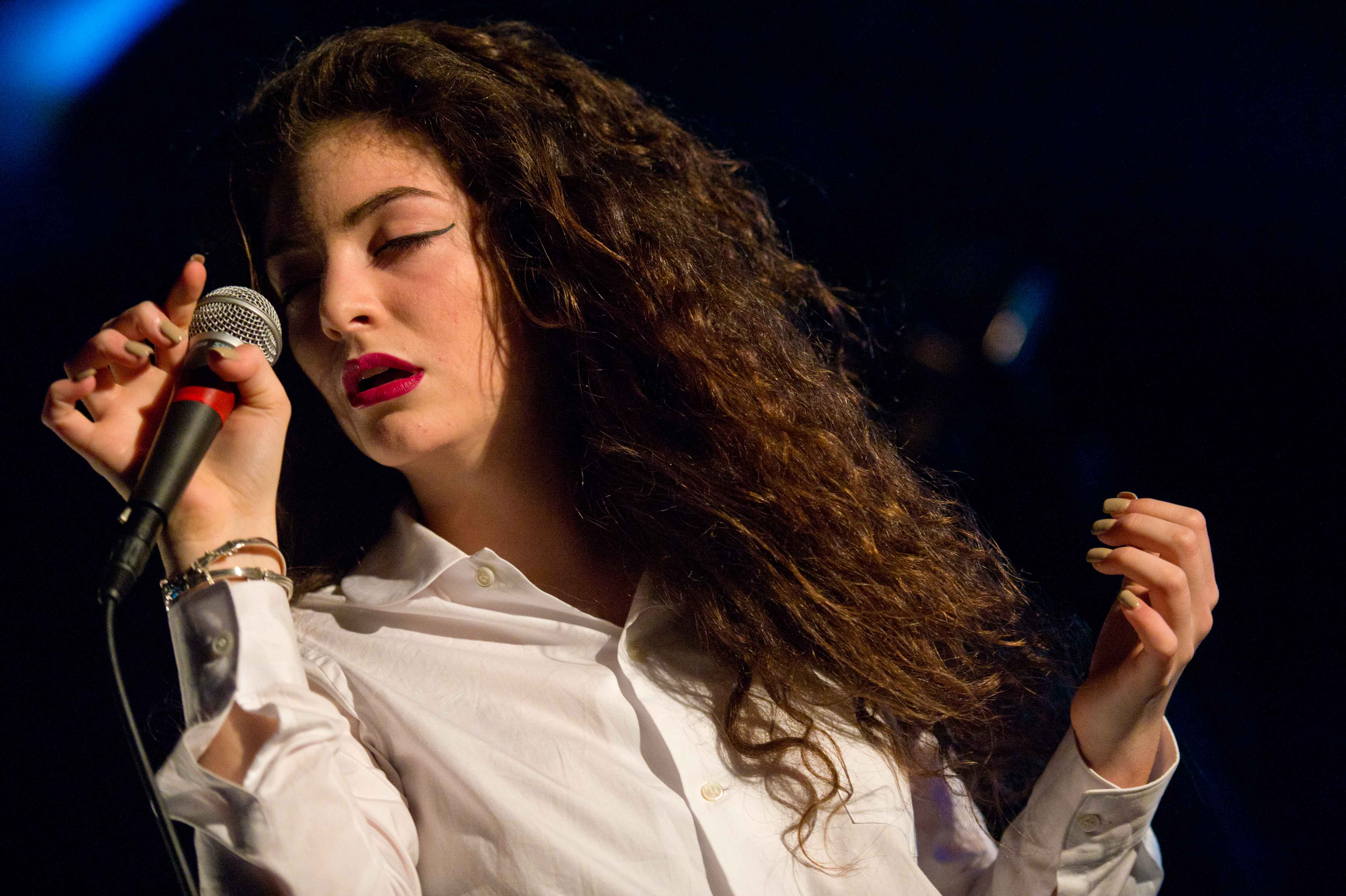
Lorde's "Royals" was the longest running top 10 single in 2013, spending 23 weeks in the top 10.

List of artists by total songs peaking in the top-ten
Artist	Numbers of songs
Drake	4
Bruno Mars	3
Eminem	3
Justin Timberlake	3
Maroon 5	3
Rihanna	3
Christina Aguilera	2
Imagine Dragons	2
Jay-Z	2
Kesha	2
Lady Gaga	2
Macklemore & Ryan Lewis	2
Miley Cyrus	2
One Direction	2
Pharrell Williams	2
Pink	2
Pitbull	2

== See also ==
- 2013 in American music
- List of Billboard Hot 100 number ones of 2013
- Billboard Year-End Hot 100 singles of 2013

== Notes ==
^{A} The single re-entered the top ten on the week ending January 12, 2013.
^{B} The single re-entered the top ten on the week ending January 19, 2013.
^{C} The single re-entered the top ten on the week ending February 23, 2013.
^{D} The single re-entered the top ten on the week ending March 16, 2013.
^{E} The single re-entered the top ten on the week ending March 23, 2013.
^{F} The single re-entered the top ten on the week ending May 11, 2013.
^{G} The single re-entered the top ten on the week ending May 18, 2013.
^{H} The single re-entered the top ten on the week ending June 22, 2013.
^{I} The single re-entered the top ten on the week ending July 13, 2013.
^{J} The single re-entered the top ten on the week ending September 21, 2013.
^{K} The single re-entered the top ten on the week ending October 5, 2013.
^{L} The single re-entered the top ten on the week ending December 21, 2013.
^{M} The single re-entered the top ten on the week ending December 28, 2013.
