= List of number-one R&B/hip-hop songs of 2013 (U.S.) =

On October 20, 2012, Billboard relaunched many of its charts by incorporating the same methodology used for determining the rankings on the Billboard Hot 100 by a combination of sales, airplay, and streaming activity. Included in those changes were the R&B/Hip-Hop Songs, Rap Songs, and R&B/Hip-Hop Airplay charts, as well as the introduction of the R&B Songs chart. The R&B and Rap Songs charts serve as distillations of the overall R&B/Hip-Hop Songs chart and are aimed to highlight the differences between R&B and rap titles.

== List of number ones ==
Key
†	Indicates best-charting R&B/Hip-Hop, R&B, Rap and Airplay singles of 2013

Issue date	R&B/Hip-Hop Songs	Artist	R&B Songs	Artist	Rap Songs	Artist	R&B/Hip-Hop Airplay	Artist	Refs.
January 5	"Diamonds"	Rihanna	"Diamonds"	Rihanna	"I Cry"	Flo Rida	"Adorn" †	Miguel	
January 12	"Diamonds"	Rihanna	"Diamonds"	Rihanna	"Gangnam Style"	PSY	"Adorn" †	Miguel	
January 19	"Diamonds"	Rihanna	"Diamonds"	Rihanna	"Thrift Shop" †	Macklemore & Ryan Lewis featuring Wanz	"Adorn" †	Miguel	
January 26	"Thrift Shop" †	Macklemore & Ryan Lewis featuring Wanz	"Diamonds"	Rihanna	"Thrift Shop" †	Macklemore & Ryan Lewis featuring Wanz	"Adorn" †	Miguel	
February 2	"Thrift Shop" †	Macklemore & Ryan Lewis featuring Wanz	"Suit & Tie"	Justin Timberlake featuring Jay-Z	"Thrift Shop" †	Macklemore & Ryan Lewis featuring Wanz	"Adorn" †	Miguel	
February 9	"Thrift Shop" †	Macklemore & Ryan Lewis featuring Wanz	"Diamonds"	Rihanna	"Thrift Shop" †	Macklemore & Ryan Lewis featuring Wanz	"Adorn" †	Miguel	
February 16	"Thrift Shop" †	Macklemore & Ryan Lewis featuring Wanz	"Diamonds"	Rihanna	"Thrift Shop" †	Macklemore & Ryan Lewis featuring Wanz	"Adorn" †	Miguel	
February 23	"Thrift Shop" †	Macklemore & Ryan Lewis featuring Wanz	"Suit & Tie"	Justin Timberlake featuring Jay-Z	"Thrift Shop" †	Macklemore & Ryan Lewis featuring Wanz	"Fuckin' Problems"	ASAP Rocky featuring Drake, 2 Chainz & Kendrick Lamar	
March 2	"Thrift Shop" †	Macklemore & Ryan Lewis featuring Wanz	"Suit & Tie"	Justin Timberlake featuring Jay-Z	"Thrift Shop" †	Macklemore & Ryan Lewis featuring Wanz	"Pour It Up"	Rihanna	
March 9	"Thrift Shop" †	Macklemore & Ryan Lewis featuring Wanz	"Suit & Tie"	Justin Timberlake featuring Jay-Z	"Thrift Shop" †	Macklemore & Ryan Lewis featuring Wanz	"Pour It Up"	Rihanna	
March 16	"Thrift Shop" †	Macklemore & Ryan Lewis featuring Wanz	"Suit & Tie"	Justin Timberlake featuring Jay-Z	"Thrift Shop" †	Macklemore & Ryan Lewis featuring Wanz	"Pour It Up"	Rihanna	
March 23	"Thrift Shop" †	Macklemore & Ryan Lewis featuring Wanz	"Suit & Tie"	Justin Timberlake featuring Jay-Z	"Thrift Shop" †	Macklemore & Ryan Lewis featuring Wanz	"Pour It Up"	Rihanna	
March 30	"Thrift Shop" †	Macklemore & Ryan Lewis featuring Wanz	"Suit & Tie"	Justin Timberlake featuring Jay-Z	"Thrift Shop" †	Macklemore & Ryan Lewis featuring Wanz	"Pour It Up"	Rihanna	
April 6	"Thrift Shop" †	Macklemore & Ryan Lewis featuring Wanz	"Suit & Tie"	Justin Timberlake featuring Jay-Z	"Thrift Shop" †	Macklemore & Ryan Lewis featuring Wanz	"Pour It Up"	Rihanna	
April 13	"Thrift Shop" †	Macklemore & Ryan Lewis featuring Wanz	"Suit & Tie"	Justin Timberlake featuring Jay-Z	"Thrift Shop" †	Macklemore & Ryan Lewis featuring Wanz	"Adorn" †	Miguel	
April 20	"Thrift Shop" †	Macklemore & Ryan Lewis featuring Wanz	"Suit & Tie"	Justin Timberlake featuring Jay-Z	"Thrift Shop" †	Macklemore & Ryan Lewis featuring Wanz	"Started from the Bottom"	Drake	
April 27	"Thrift Shop" †	Macklemore & Ryan Lewis featuring Wanz	"Suit & Tie"	Justin Timberlake featuring Jay-Z	"Thrift Shop" †	Macklemore & Ryan Lewis featuring Wanz	"Pour It Up"	Rihanna	
May 4	"Can't Hold Us"	Macklemore & Ryan Lewis featuring Ray Dalton	"Suit & Tie"	Justin Timberlake featuring Jay-Z	"Can't Hold Us"	Macklemore & Ryan Lewis featuring Ray Dalton	"Pour It Up"	Rihanna	
May 11	"Can't Hold Us"	Macklemore & Ryan Lewis featuring Ray Dalton	"Suit & Tie"	Justin Timberlake featuring Jay-Z	"Can't Hold Us"	Macklemore & Ryan Lewis featuring Ray Dalton	"Bad"	Wale featuring Tiara Thomas	
May 18	"Can't Hold Us"	Macklemore & Ryan Lewis featuring Ray Dalton	"Suit & Tie"	Justin Timberlake featuring Jay-Z	"Can't Hold Us"	Macklemore & Ryan Lewis featuring Ray Dalton	"Bad"	Wale featuring Tiara Thomas	
May 25	"Can't Hold Us"	Macklemore & Ryan Lewis featuring Ray Dalton	"Suit & Tie"	Justin Timberlake featuring Jay-Z	"Can't Hold Us"	Macklemore & Ryan Lewis featuring Ray Dalton	"Bad"	Wale featuring Tiara Thomas	
June 1	"Can't Hold Us"	Macklemore & Ryan Lewis featuring Ray Dalton	"Blurred Lines" †	Robin Thicke featuring T.I. & Pharrell	"Can't Hold Us"	Macklemore & Ryan Lewis featuring Ray Dalton	"Bad"	Wale featuring Tiara Thomas	
June 8	"Can't Hold Us"	Macklemore & Ryan Lewis featuring Ray Dalton	"Blurred Lines" †	Robin Thicke featuring T.I. & Pharrell	"Can't Hold Us"	Macklemore & Ryan Lewis featuring Ray Dalton	"Bad"	Wale featuring Tiara Thomas	
June 15	"Can't Hold Us"	Macklemore & Ryan Lewis featuring Ray Dalton	"Blurred Lines" †	Robin Thicke featuring T.I. & Pharrell	"Can't Hold Us"	Macklemore & Ryan Lewis featuring Ray Dalton	"Bad"	Wale featuring Tiara Thomas	
June 22	"Blurred Lines"	Robin Thicke featuring T.I. & Pharrell	"Blurred Lines" †	Robin Thicke featuring T.I. & Pharrell	"Can't Hold Us"	Macklemore & Ryan Lewis featuring Ray Dalton	"Bad"	Wale featuring Tiara Thomas	
June 29	"Blurred Lines"	Robin Thicke featuring T.I. & Pharrell	"Blurred Lines" †	Robin Thicke featuring T.I. & Pharrell	"Can't Hold Us"	Macklemore & Ryan Lewis featuring Ray Dalton	"Bad"	Wale featuring Tiara Thomas	
July 6	"Blurred Lines"	Robin Thicke featuring T.I. & Pharrell	"Blurred Lines" †	Robin Thicke featuring T.I. & Pharrell	"Can't Hold Us"	Macklemore & Ryan Lewis featuring Ray Dalton	"Power Trip"	J. Cole featuring Miguel	
July 13	"Blurred Lines"	Robin Thicke featuring T.I. & Pharrell	"Blurred Lines" †	Robin Thicke featuring T.I. & Pharrell	"Can't Hold Us"	Macklemore & Ryan Lewis featuring Ray Dalton	"Power Trip"	J. Cole featuring Miguel	
July 20	"Blurred Lines"	Robin Thicke featuring T.I. & Pharrell	"Blurred Lines" †	Robin Thicke featuring T.I. & Pharrell	"Can't Hold Us"	Macklemore & Ryan Lewis featuring Ray Dalton	"Power Trip"	J. Cole featuring Miguel	
July 27	"Blurred Lines"	Robin Thicke featuring T.I. & Pharrell	"Blurred Lines" †	Robin Thicke featuring T.I. & Pharrell	"Can't Hold Us"	Macklemore & Ryan Lewis featuring Ray Dalton	"Power Trip"	J. Cole featuring Miguel	
August 3	"Blurred Lines"	Robin Thicke featuring T.I. & Pharrell	"Blurred Lines" †	Robin Thicke featuring T.I. & Pharrell	"Can't Hold Us"	Macklemore & Ryan Lewis featuring Ray Dalton	"Blurred Lines"	Robin Thicke featuring T.I. and Pharrell Williams	
August 10	"Blurred Lines"	Robin Thicke featuring T.I. & Pharrell	"Blurred Lines" †	Robin Thicke featuring T.I. & Pharrell	"Holy Grail"	Jay-Z featuring Justin Timberlake	"Blurred Lines"	Robin Thicke featuring T.I. and Pharrell Williams	
August 17	"Blurred Lines"	Robin Thicke featuring T.I. & Pharrell	"Blurred Lines" †	Robin Thicke featuring T.I. & Pharrell	"Holy Grail"	Jay-Z featuring Justin Timberlake	"Blurred Lines"	Robin Thicke featuring T.I. and Pharrell Williams	
August 24	"Blurred Lines"	Robin Thicke featuring T.I. & Pharrell	"Blurred Lines" †	Robin Thicke featuring T.I. & Pharrell	"Holy Grail"	Jay-Z featuring Justin Timberlake	"Blurred Lines"	Robin Thicke featuring T.I. and Pharrell Williams	
August 31	"Blurred Lines"	Robin Thicke featuring T.I. & Pharrell	"Blurred Lines" †	Robin Thicke featuring T.I. & Pharrell	"Holy Grail"	Jay-Z featuring Justin Timberlake	"Blurred Lines"	Robin Thicke featuring T.I. and Pharrell Williams	
September 7	"Blurred Lines"	Robin Thicke featuring T.I. & Pharrell	"Blurred Lines" †	Robin Thicke featuring T.I. & Pharrell	"Holy Grail"	Jay-Z featuring Justin Timberlake	"Blurred Lines"	Robin Thicke featuring T.I. and Pharrell Williams	
September 14	"Blurred Lines"	Robin Thicke featuring T.I. & Pharrell	"Blurred Lines" †	Robin Thicke featuring T.I. & Pharrell	"Berzerk"	Eminem	"Blurred Lines"	Robin Thicke featuring T.I. and Pharrell Williams	
September 21	"Blurred Lines"	Robin Thicke featuring T.I. & Pharrell	"Blurred Lines" †	Robin Thicke featuring T.I. & Pharrell	"Holy Grail"	Jay-Z featuring Justin Timberlake	"Blurred Lines"	Robin Thicke featuring T.I. and Pharrell Williams	
September 28	"Blurred Lines"	Robin Thicke featuring T.I. & Pharrell	"Blurred Lines" †	Robin Thicke featuring T.I. & Pharrell	"Holy Grail"	Jay-Z featuring Justin Timberlake	"Blurred Lines"	Robin Thicke featuring T.I. and Pharrell Williams	
October 5	"Blurred Lines"	Robin Thicke featuring T.I. & Pharrell	"Blurred Lines" †	Robin Thicke featuring T.I. & Pharrell	"Holy Grail"	Jay-Z featuring Justin Timberlake	"Blurred Lines"	Robin Thicke featuring T.I. and Pharrell Williams	
October 12	"Hold On, We're Going Home"	Drake featuring Majid Jordan	"Hold On, We're Going Home"	Drake featuring Majid Jordan	"Holy Grail"	Jay-Z featuring Justin Timberlake	"Blurred Lines"	Robin Thicke featuring T.I. and Pharrell Williams	
October 19	"Hold On, We're Going Home"	Drake featuring Majid Jordan	"Hold On, We're Going Home"	Drake featuring Majid Jordan	"Holy Grail"	Jay-Z featuring Justin Timberlake	"Blurred Lines"	Robin Thicke featuring T.I. and Pharrell Williams	
October 26	"Hold On, We're Going Home"	Drake featuring Majid Jordan	"Hold On, We're Going Home"	Drake featuring Majid Jordan	"Holy Grail"	Jay-Z featuring Justin Timberlake	"Hold On, We're Going Home"	Drake featuring Majid Jordan	
November 2	"Hold On, We're Going Home"	Drake featuring Majid Jordan	"Hold On, We're Going Home"	Drake featuring Majid Jordan	"Rap God"	Eminem	"Hold On, We're Going Home"	Drake featuring Majid Jordan	
November 9	"Hold On, We're Going Home"	Drake featuring Majid Jordan	"Hold On, We're Going Home"	Drake featuring Majid Jordan	"Holy Grail"	Jay-Z featuring Justin Timberlake	"Hold On, We're Going Home"	Drake featuring Majid Jordan	
November 16	"The Monster"	Eminem featuring Rihanna	"Hold On, We're Going Home"	Drake featuring Majid Jordan	"The Monster"	Eminem featuring Rihanna	"Hold On, We're Going Home"	Drake featuring Majid Jordan	
November 23	"The Monster"	Eminem featuring Rihanna	"Hold On, We're Going Home"	Drake featuring Majid Jordan	"The Monster"	Eminem featuring Rihanna	"Hold On, We're Going Home"	Drake featuring Majid Jordan	
November 30	"The Monster"	Eminem featuring Rihanna	"Hold On, We're Going Home"	Drake featuring Majid Jordan	"The Monster"	Eminem featuring Rihanna	"Hold On, We're Going Home"	Drake featuring Majid Jordan	
December 7	"The Monster"	Eminem featuring Rihanna	"Hold On, We're Going Home"	Drake featuring Majid Jordan	"The Monster"	Eminem featuring Rihanna	"Hold On, We're Going Home"	Drake featuring Majid Jordan	
December 14	"The Monster"	Eminem featuring Rihanna	"Hold On, We're Going Home"	Drake featuring Majid Jordan	"The Monster"	Eminem featuring Rihanna	"Hold On, We're Going Home"	Drake featuring Majid Jordan	
December 21	"The Monster"	Eminem featuring Rihanna	"Hold On, We're Going Home"	Drake featuring Majid Jordan	"The Monster"	Eminem featuring Rihanna	"Hold On, We're Going Home"	Drake featuring Majid Jordan	
December 28	"The Monster"	Eminem featuring Rihanna	"Hold On, We're Going Home"	Drake featuring Majid Jordan	"The Monster"	Eminem featuring Rihanna	"Hold On, We're Going Home"	Drake featuring Majid Jordan	

== See also ==
- 2013 in music
- Billboard Year-End Hot R&B/Hip-Hop Songs of 2013
- List of number-one R&B albums of 2013 (U.S.)
- List of number-one rap albums of 2013 (U.S.)
- List of Hot 100 number-one singles of 2013 (U.S.)
