= List of Billboard number-one R&B/hip-hop albums of 2013 =

This page lists the albums that reached number-one on the overall Top R&B/Hip-Hop Albums chart, the newly-relaunched R&B Albums chart and the Rap Albums chart in 2013. The R&B Albums chart was introduced in the January 26, 2013 issue of Billboard as a new distinct chart, returning its name to the magazine since the rebranding of the original R&B chart in 1999. The Rap and R&B albums charts serve as partial distillations of rap and R&B-specific titles, respectively, from the overall R&B/Hip-Hop Albums chart.

== List of number ones ==
Key
†	Indicates best-performing albums of 2013

Issue date	R&B/Hip-Hop Albums	Artist(s)	R&B Albums	Artist(s)	Rap Albums	Artist(s)	Refs.
January 5	Trouble Man: Heavy Is the Head	T.I.	Chart debuted the week of January 26, 2013.		Trouble Man: Heavy Is the Head	T.I.	
January 12	Trouble Man: Heavy Is the Head	T.I.	Chart debuted the week of January 26, 2013.		Trouble Man: Heavy Is the Head	T.I.	
January 19	Girl on Fire	Alicia Keys	Chart debuted the week of January 26, 2013.		Good Kid, M.A.A.D City	Kendrick Lamar	
January 26	Trouble Man: Heavy Is the Head	T.I.	Unapologetic	Rihanna	Trouble Man: Heavy Is the Head	T.I.	
February 2	Long. Live. ASAP	ASAP Rocky	Unapologetic	Rihanna	Long. Live. ASAP	ASAP Rocky	
February 9	Long. Live. ASAP	ASAP Rocky	Unapologetic	Rihanna	Long. Live. ASAP	ASAP Rocky	
February 16	Love, Charlie	Charlie Wilson	Love, Charlie	Charlie Wilson	Long. Live. ASAP	ASAP Rocky	
February 23	No Love Lost	Joe Budden	Unapologetic	Rihanna	No Love Lost	Joe Budden	
March 2	Unapologetic	Rihanna	Unapologetic	Rihanna	Long. Live. ASAP	ASAP Rocky	
March 9	Unapologetic	Rihanna	Unapologetic	Rihanna	The Heist	Macklemore & Ryan Lewis	
March 16	The Heist	Macklemore & Ryan Lewis	Unapologetic	Rihanna	The Heist	Macklemore & Ryan Lewis	
March 23	The Heist	Macklemore & Ryan Lewis	Unapologetic	Rihanna	The Heist	Macklemore & Ryan Lewis	
March 30	All Around The World	Mindless Behavior	All Around The World	Mindless Behavior	The Heist	Macklemore & Ryan Lewis	
April 6	The 20/20 Experience †	Justin Timberlake	The 20/20 Experience	Justin Timberlake	The Heist	Macklemore & Ryan Lewis	
April 13	The 20/20 Experience †	Justin Timberlake	The 20/20 Experience	Justin Timberlake	I Am Not a Human Being II	Lil Wayne	
April 20	The 20/20 Experience †	Justin Timberlake	The 20/20 Experience	Justin Timberlake	Wolf	Tyler, the Creator	
April 27	The 20/20 Experience †	Justin Timberlake	The 20/20 Experience	Justin Timberlake	Hotel California	Tyga	
May 4	Indicud	Kid Cudi	The 20/20 Experience	Justin Timberlake	Indicud	Kid Cudi	
May 11	Side Effects of You	Fantasia	Side Effects of You	Fantasia	Indicud	Kid Cudi	
May 18	The 20/20 Experience †	Justin Timberlake	The 20/20 Experience	Justin Timberlake	The Heist	Macklemore & Ryan Lewis	
May 25	The 20/20 Experience †	Justin Timberlake	The 20/20 Experience	Justin Timberlake	The Heist	Macklemore & Ryan Lewis	
June 1	The 20/20 Experience †	Justin Timberlake	The 20/20 Experience	Justin Timberlake	The Heist	Macklemore & Ryan Lewis	
June 8	Excuse My French	French Montana	The 20/20 Experience	Justin Timberlake	Excuse My French	French Montana	
June 15	The 20/20 Experience †	Justin Timberlake	The 20/20 Experience	Justin Timberlake	The Heist	Macklemore & Ryan Lewis	
June 22	The 20/20 Experience †	Justin Timberlake	The 20/20 Experience	Justin Timberlake	The Heist	Macklemore & Ryan Lewis	
June 29	The 20/20 Experience †	Justin Timberlake	The 20/20 Experience	Justin Timberlake	The Wack Album	The Lonely Island	
July 6	Yeezus	Kanye West	Talk a Good Game	Kelly Rowland	Yeezus	Kanye West	
July 13	The Gifted	Wale	Songversation	India Arie	The Gifted	Wale	
July 20	Born Sinner	J. Cole	Doubleback: Evolution of R&B	Joe	Born Sinner	J. Cole	
July 27	Magna Carta Holy Grail	Jay-Z	Ciara	Ciara	Magna Carta Holy Grail	Jay-Z	
August 3	Magna Carta Holy Grail	Jay-Z	The 20/20 Experience	Justin Timberlake	Magna Carta Holy Grail	Jay-Z	
August 10	Magna Carta Holy Grail	Jay-Z	The 20/20 Experience	Justin Timberlake	Magna Carta Holy Grail	Jay-Z	
August 17	Blurred Lines	Robin Thicke	Blurred Lines	Robin Thicke	Magna Carta Holy Grail	Jay-Z	
August 24	Blurred Lines	Robin Thicke	Blurred Lines	Robin Thicke	Magna Carta Holy Grail	Jay-Z	
August 31	Rebellious Soul	K. Michelle	Rebellious Soul	K. Michelle	Magna Carta Holy Grail	Jay-Z	
September 7	3 Kings	TGT	3 Kings	TGT	Doris	Earl Sweatshirt	
September 14	Hall of Fame	Big Sean	Blurred Lines	Robin Thicke	Hall of Fame	Big Sean	
September 21	Love and War	Tamar Braxton	Love and War	Tamar Braxton	Stay Trippy	Juicy J	
September 28	Kiss Land	The Weeknd	Kiss Land	The Weeknd	B.O.A.T.S. II: Me Time	2 Chainz	
October 5	Self Made Vol. 3	Maybach Music Group	Kiss Land	The Weeknd	Self Made Vol. 3	Maybach Music Group	
October 12	Nothing Was the Same	Drake	Blurred Lines	Robin Thicke	Nothing Was the Same	Drake	
October 19	The 20/20 Experience - 2 of 2	Justin Timberlake	The 20/20 Experience - 2 of 2	Justin Timberlake	Nothing Was the Same	Drake	
October 26	Nothing Was the Same	Drake	The 20/20 Experience - 2 of 2	Justin Timberlake	Nothing Was the Same	Drake	
November 2	Nothing Was the Same	Drake	The 20/20 Experience - 2 of 2	Justin Timberlake	Nothing Was the Same	Drake	
November 9	Nothing Was the Same	Drake	The 20/20 Experience - 2 of 2	Justin Timberlake	Nothing Was the Same	Drake	
November 16	Nothing Was the Same	Drake	The 20/20 Experience - 2 of 2	Justin Timberlake	Nothing Was the Same	Drake	
November 23	The Marshall Mathers LP 2	Eminem	The 20/20 Experience - 2 of 2	Justin Timberlake	The Marshall Mathers LP 2	Eminem	
November 30	The Marshall Mathers LP 2	Eminem	Sail Out	Jhené Aiko	The Marshall Mathers LP 2	Eminem	
December 7	The Marshall Mathers LP 2	Eminem	A Mary Christmas	Mary J. Blige	The Marshall Mathers LP 2	Eminem	
December 14	The Marshall Mathers LP 2	Eminem	The 20/20 Experience - 2 of 2	Justin Timberlake	The Marshall Mathers LP 2	Eminem	
December 21	The Marshall Mathers LP 2	Eminem	A Mary Christmas	Mary J. Blige	The Marshall Mathers LP 2	Eminem	
December 28	Beyoncé	Beyoncé	Beyoncé	Beyoncé	Because the Internet	Childish Gambino	

== See also ==
- 2013 in American music
- 2013 in hip hop music
- List of number-one R&B/hip-hop songs of 2013 (U.S.)
- List of Billboard 200 number-one albums of 2013
