= Wop (song) =

Single by J. Dash featuring Flo Rida

from the album Tabloid Truth
- Released: January 1, 2011
- Recorded: April 3, 2007
- Genre: Hip hop
- Length: 3:20
- Label: StereoFame
- Songwriter: Jameyel Johnson

"Wop" (Stylized in all caps) is a song by rapper J. Dash featuring rapper Flo Rida. First recorded in 2007, it was released in 2011 to serve as the lead single for J. Dash's album Tabloid Truth, released in 2012.

Upon the release of the album, "Wop" became a minor hit on Billboard's Hot R&B/Hip-Hop Songs chart, but received renewed attention in March 2013 after pop singer Miley Cyrus posted a viral video of herself twerking to the song. The popularity of the video, along with parodies and responses made by fans, influenced its re-emergence on the Billboard Hot 100 in March 2013, peaking at #51 on the Hot 100, and #14 on the Hot R&B/Hip-Hop Songs chart.

== Background ==
"Wop" was the name given to a hip hop dance that J. Dash and his friends had done to other songs at nightclubs. The song itself was created after he felt that they were "missing the track to go with our steps".

== Release and history ==
"Wop" was initially posted on J. Dash's YouTube channel in 2007; however, as the song began to go viral through user-posted videos of people performing its associated dance routine, he pulled the song and began work on a revised version to be released as a single, followed by an official music video featuring fellow rapper Flo Rida in January 2011. The song would chart near the bottom of Billboard's Hot R&B/Hip-Hop Songs, and by March 2012, at least 437,000 digital downloads of the song had been sold, and the video had reached 5.7 million views.

The song would re-emerge to mainstream exposure on March 20, 2013, when Miley Cyrus posted a video on Facebook which featured her twerking to "Wop" while wearing a unicorn onesie. While Cyrus had previously shared her fondness for the song with J. Dash and suggested that they make a video together, these plans never came to fruition. J. Dash was initially unaware of the video's creation, but would learn of the video from his personal friends and Cyrus herself while he was sick in bed with a stomach virus. He declared the video to be the moment that twerking became a mainstream phenomenon, and jokingly suggested that he and Cyrus should get matching unicorn tattoos.

Miley Cyrus's "Wop" video would also go viral; by April 9, 2013, copies of the video had amassed over 4 million views on YouTube. In response to the influence of viral videos on the popularity of other pop songs such as Carly Rae Jepsen's "Call Me Maybe" and Psy's "Gangnam Style" on the Billboard Hot 100, Billboard had added YouTube views as a factor to its Hot 100 chart in February 2013. This resulted in "Wop" ascending the chart following the release of the Miley Cyrus video; it entered at #82, and rose to #52 the following week. "Wop", along with "Don't Drop That Thun Thun"—a song popularized by another twerking video posted on Vine in July 2013, were cited as an example of how viral and user-created videos can bring renewed interest to songs. Spin writer Jordan Sargent considered "Wop" to be hip hop's "Harlem Shake moment", but not a meme to the same extent as it.

On December 14, 2018, the song was certified two times Platinum by the RIAA.

== Music video ==
The official music video for "Wop" was released on YouTube in January 2011. Filmed on a beach in Miami, fellow rapper Flo Rida made a cameo appearance in the video and provided an additional verse for the song. The two artists have not been strangers to appearing together in concert; J. Dash recalled an instance where they were both among the artists opening for Rick Ross when he performed in Gainesville.

== Charts ==
=== Weekly charts ===
Weekly chart performance
Chart (2013–14)	Peak position
US Billboard Hot 100	51
US Hot R&B/Hip-Hop Songs (Billboard)	14
US Hot Rap Songs (Billboard)	11

=== Year-end charts ===
Annual chart rankings
Chart (2013)	Rank
US Streaming Songs (Billboard)	64

== Certifications ==
Region	Certification	Certified units/sales
United States (RIAA)	2× Platinum	2,000,000^{‡}
^{‡} Sales+streaming figures based on certification alone.
