= Don't Drop That Thun Thun =

Single by The Finatticz
- Released: April 30, 2012
- Genre: Snap
- Length: 3:22
- Label: Knockout; Entertainment One
- Producer: DK FADED

The Finatticz singles chronology
"Don't Drop That Thun Thun" (2012)	"Pushing" (2014)

"Don't Drop That Thun Thun" is a song by The Finatticz. First released in April 2012 as the group's debut single, the song was a minor success locally. "Don't Drop That Thun Thun" experienced a burst in mainstream popularity in July 2013, after its use in a viral video uploaded to Vine which featured a group of women twerking to the song. As a result of the meme which developed around the song on Vine, sales of the "Don't Drop That Thun Thun" single dramatically increased; the song would peak at number 10 on Billboard's Hot R&B/Hip-Hop Songs chart, and reach number 35 on the Billboard Hot 100.

== Composition ==
"Don't Drop That Thun Thun" is a hip hop song of a style known as ratchet; LA Weekly noted its minimalistic sound and nursery rhyme-like lyrics, describing it as "little more than a rubbery bass line, electronic cymbal crashes and a vocal hook, 'Don't drop that thun thun thun,' repeated ad infinitum." The titular "thun thun" mentioned in the song is a slang term for the drug MDMA, popularly known as ecstasy.

== Release and history ==
"Don't Drop That Thun Thun" was first released in April 2012 as the debut single of The Finatticz, a Los Angeles-based hip hop group. Produced by Payso B, the song was first recorded three years prior, with group member James "Killa" Dunn claiming they had recorded it in just fifteen minutes. "Don't Drop That Thun Thun" would premiere later the same day at a house party hosted by a friend of one of the group's members. Later on, Payso b would bring the song to the attention of fellow producer Ray J, who in turn, presented it to Alan Grunblatt, president of eOne Music. eOne would ultimately sign The Finatticz to Ray J's imprint Knockout Entertainment to release "Don't Drop That Thun Thun", with an option of releasing an album in the future. The song proved to be a hit locally, and received heavy airplay on L.A.-based radio stations such as Power 106—whose on-air personality DJ Carisma was an early supporter of the track.

On July 9, 2013, a video was posted on the Twitter-owned video sharing service Vine entitled "Twerk Team", which featured a group of five women provocatively twerking to "Don't Drop That Thun Thun". The clip was shared by users over 100,000 times, and users created their own responses and parodies featuring the song, collected under the hashtags "#dontdropthat" and "#thunthun". The viral popularity of the Vine clips led to an unexpected increase in sales for the song; prior to the posting of the "Twerk Team" clip, only 4,000 copies of the song had been sold; in the following weeks, sales went up to 34,000, then to over 72,000. By late-July, "Don't Drop That Thun Thun" had reached number 5 on the Billboard R&B/Hip-Hop Digital Songs chart, and it eventually peaked at number 35 on the Billboard Hot 100. The unexpected growth in popularity for "Don't Drop That Thun Thun" was compared to a similar surge experienced by J. Dash's "Wop" just a few months prior, which was popularized by a twerking video posted by pop singer Miley Cyrus.

== Usage in media ==
The song was featured in the 2014 buddy cop comedy film Let's Be Cops.

== Charts ==
Chart (2013–14)	Peak position
US Billboard Hot 100	35
US Hot R&B/Hip-Hop Songs (Billboard)	10
