= J. Dash =

American rapper from Florida

- Born: Jameyel Ontonio Johnson; September 3, 1984 (age 41); Jacksonville, Florida, U.S.
- Education: University of Florida (BS)
- Genres: Hip hop
- Occupations: Rapper; songwriter; record producer; film composer
- Label: StereoFame
- Website: therealjdash.com

Jameyel Ontonio Johnson (born September 3, 1984), better known by his stage name J. Dash, is an American rapper from Jacksonville, Florida. He is best known for his 2007 single "Wop" (featuring Flo Rida), which peaked at number 51 on the Billboard Hot 100.

== Life and career ==
Raised in the American South, J. Dash went to Stanton College Preparatory School and played in the school band. He has a bachelor's degree from the University of Florida. His first approach to music was at the age of 5, when he learned to play piano by ear. At age 12 he was in a blues band, and later played keyboards in the band Fusebox Funk.

J. Dash's single, "Wop", reached the no. 1 position on the Billboard Heatseekers Songs chart on April 13, 2013. The song is prominently featured in Céline Sciamma's 2014 film Girlhood.

Dash is known to be a TuneCore user, through which he distributes his own music.

He hosted the Make Music Day Bedroom Studios event on June 21, 2020, from Austin, Texas.

== Discography ==
Title	Album details
Tabloid Truth	Released: January 31, 2012; Label: StereoFame; Format: CD, digital download
