= Emotionalism =

Emotionalism may refer to:

- Placing focus on emotions
- Appearance emotionalism, a philosophical concept that inanimate objects and phenomena may convey emotions to people by their appearances resembling emotional expressions
- Emotionalism (disorder) a historical synonym for pseudobulbar affect, a neurological disorder manifested in uncontrollable displays of emotions (laughter, crying, etc.)
- Emotionalism (album), an album by The Avett Brothers
- Emotivism, also known as emotionalistic ethics
