= List of Billboard Hot 100 number ones of 2013 =

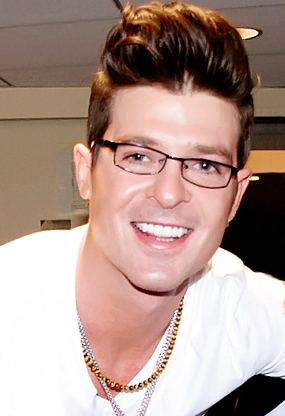
Robin Thicke (pictured) earned his first Hot 100 number-one single with "Blurred Lines", which stayed at the top position for twelve straight weeks.

The Billboard Hot 100 is a chart that ranks the best-performing singles of the United States. Its data, published by Billboard magazine and compiled by Nielsen SoundScan, is based collectively on each single's weekly physical and digital sales, as well as airplay and streaming. In 2013, a total of 11 singles claimed the top spot in 52 issues of the magazine. One of which, "Locked Out of Heaven" by singer Bruno Mars started its peak position in late 2012.

Throughout 2013, eight acts achieved their first US number-one single, either as a lead artist or a featured guest: Macklemore & Ryan Lewis, (Note: Macklemore & Ryan Lewis were credited as a duo, not two individual acts.) Wanz, Baauer, Ray Dalton, Robin Thicke, Miley Cyrus and Lorde. Nate Ruess, already having hit number one with Fun, earns his first number one song as a solo act. Five collaboration singles topped the chart. Macklemore & Ryan Lewis' debut single "Thrift Shop" featuring Wanz became the best-performing single of 2013, peaking atop the chart for six weeks, also topping the Billboard Year-End Hot 100. The duo's second hit "Can't Hold Us" also reached the chart's top spot, making the duo the first act to score number-one singles on the Hot 100 with their first two charting songs since Lady Gaga with her hits "Just Dance" and "Poker Face" in 2009. Baauer scored his first number-one hit with "Harlem Shake". Originally, it was released commercially in June 2012, yet it did not sell significantly until February due to viral videos on YouTube and later created a meme with the same name.

Macklemore & Ryan Lewis were the only act to have more than one number one song, with two.

"When I Was Your Man" was Bruno Mars' fifth single to top the chart. With the achievement, Mars became the fastest male artist to gain five number-one singles since Elvis Presley. It was also the second hit only featuring piano and vocals to peak atop the Hot 100 chart since Adele's "Someone like You" (2011). Singer Lorde's song "Royals" made her the youngest solo artist to achieve a number-one single in the US since Tiffany's "I Think We're Alone Now" (1988). "The Monster" by Eminem featuring Rihanna became the former's fifth number-one single in the country, tying him with P. Diddy and Ludacris as the rappers with the most number-one songs on the chart. Meanwhile, it also made Rihanna the artist with the third-most US number-one singles (13), alongside Michael Jackson.

"Blurred Lines" by Robin Thicke featuring T.I. and Pharrell was the longest-running single of the year at the top spot, peaking at number one for twelve consecutive weeks. With the combined chart run throughout June, July and August, "Blurred Lines" became Billboard's Song of the Summer 2013. Lorde's "Royals" became the second longest-running number-one single, claiming the top spot for a total of nine weeks. "Locked Out of Heaven" by Bruno Mars and "Thrift Shop" by Macklemore & Ryan Lewis featuring Wanz both spent six weeks atop the Hot 100. (Note: "Locked Out of Heaven" peaked at number one on the Hot 100 for two weeks in 2012, and four weeks in 2013.)

== Chart history ==
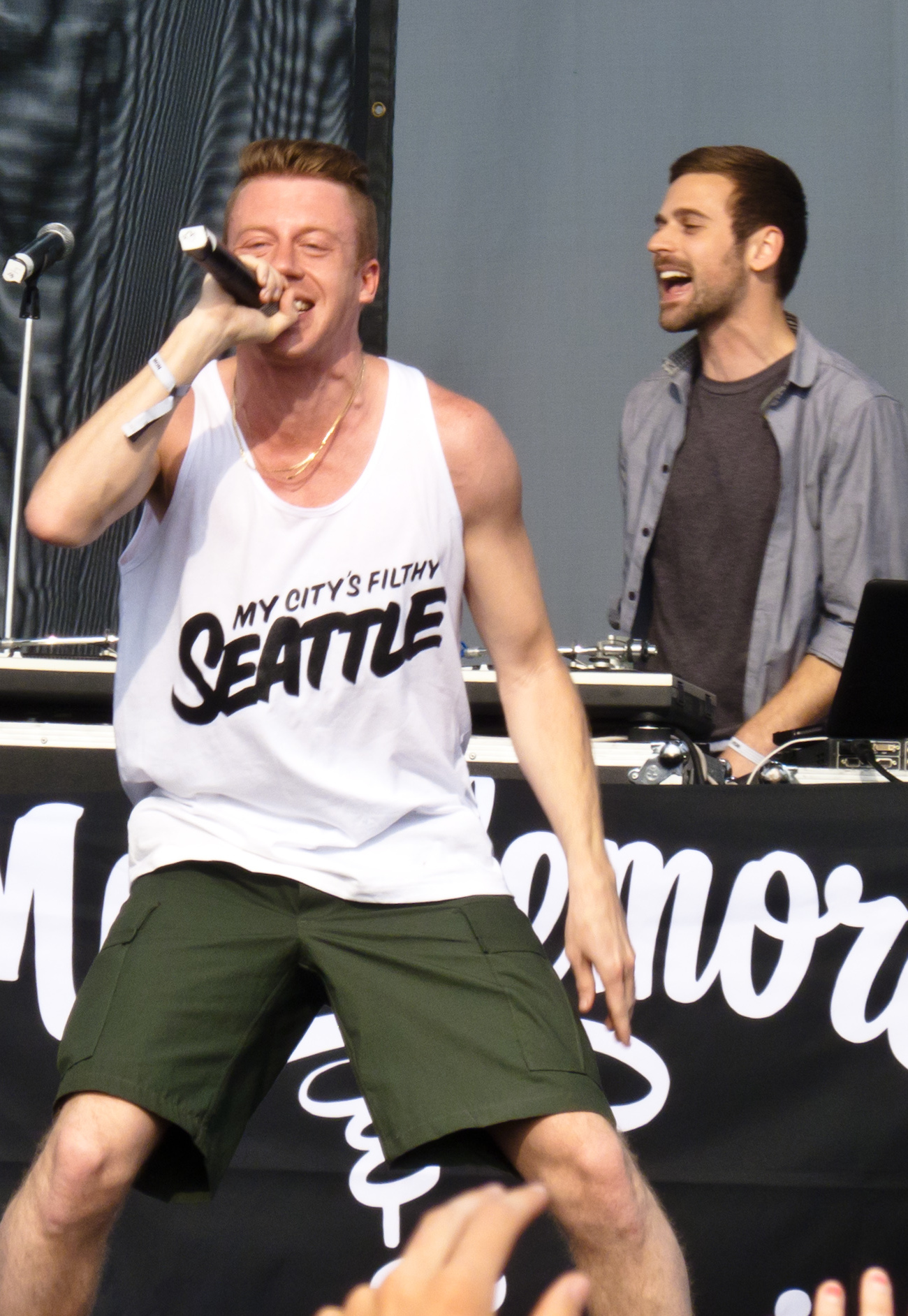
"Thrift Shop" by Macklemore & Ryan Lewis (pictured) featuring Wanz became the best-performing single of 2013. The duo scored another number-one this year with "Can't Hold Us", featuring Ray Dalton.

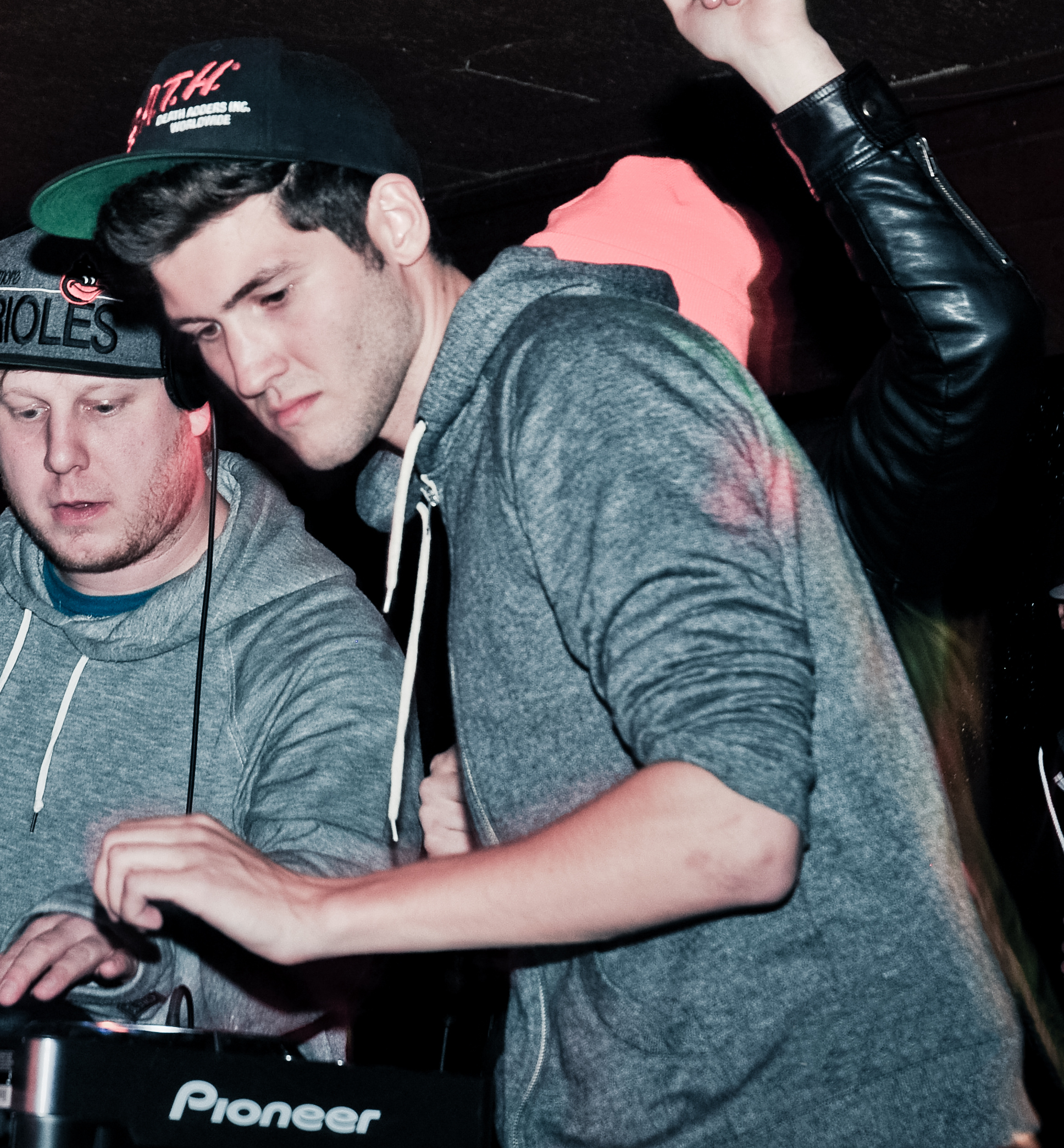
Baauer (pictured)'s "Harlem Shake" rose to the top of the chart after viral videos set to its music on YouTube, creating a meme with the same name.

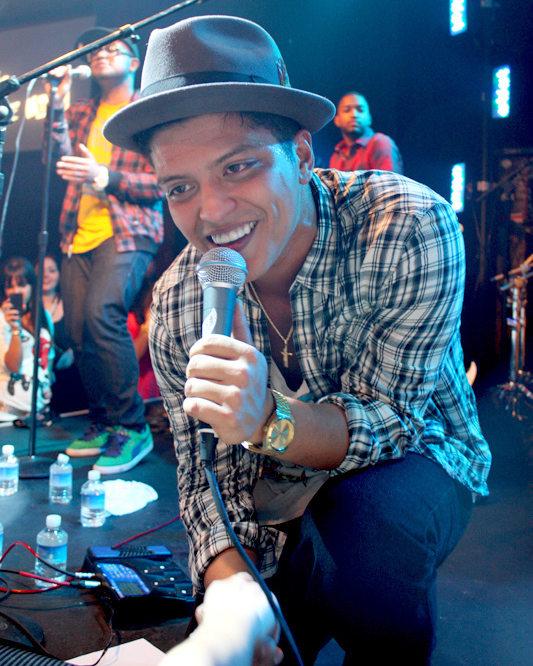
Bruno Mars (pictured) scored his fifth number-one single on the chart with "When I Was Your Man", making him the fastest male artist to earn five US number-ones since Elvis Presley.

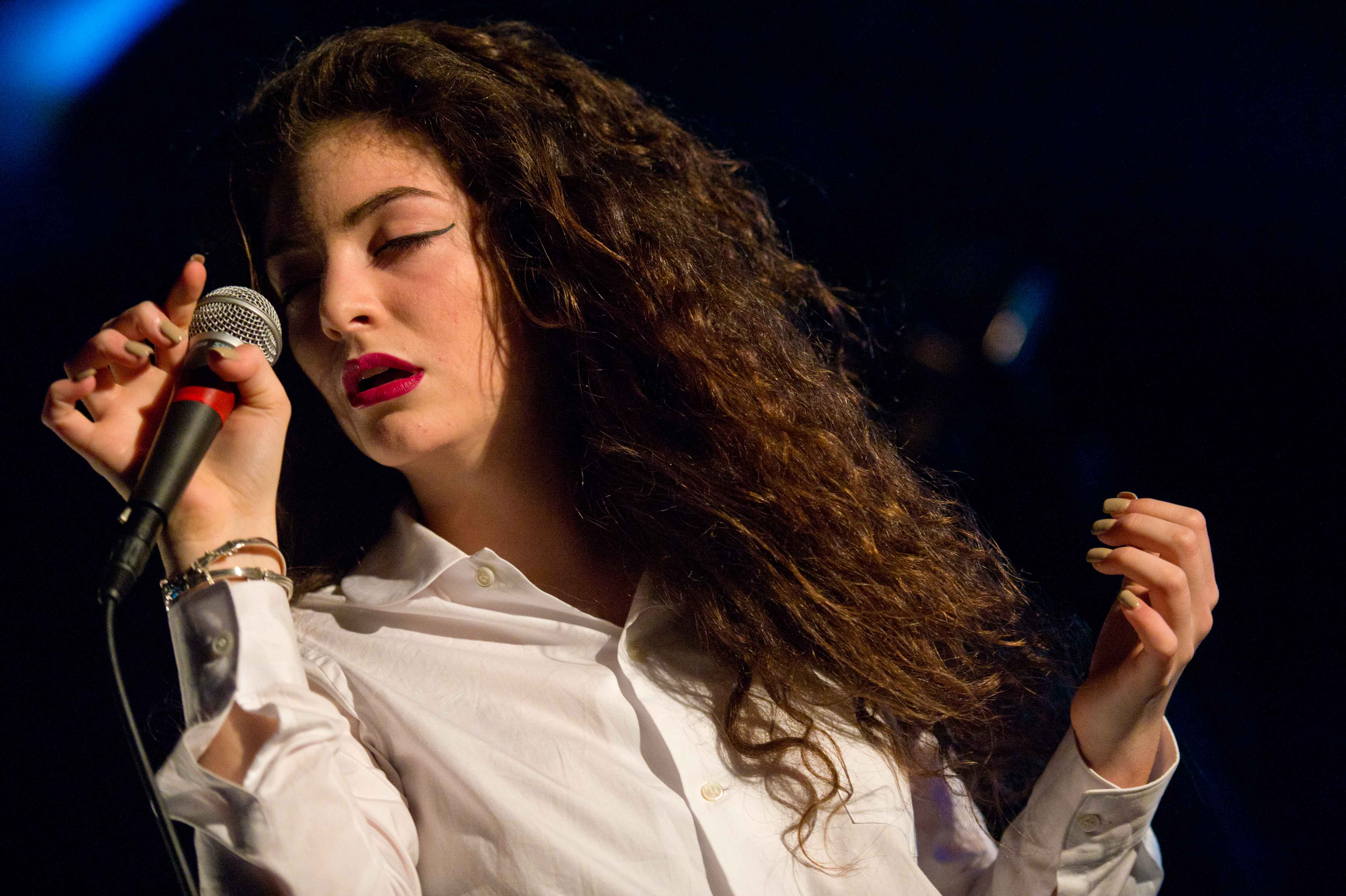
Lorde (pictured) was the youngest solo artist to achieve a US number-one single with "Royals" since Tiffany with her number-one hit "I Think We're Alone Now" in 1987.

Key
†	Indicates best-performing single of 2013

No.	Issue date	Song	Artist(s)	Ref.
1021	January 5	"Locked Out of Heaven"	Bruno Mars	
1021	January 12	"Locked Out of Heaven"	Bruno Mars	
1021	January 19	"Locked Out of Heaven"	Bruno Mars	
1021	January 26	"Locked Out of Heaven"	Bruno Mars	
1022	February 2	"Thrift Shop" †	Macklemore & Ryan Lewis featuring Wanz	
1022	February 9	"Thrift Shop" †	Macklemore & Ryan Lewis featuring Wanz	
1022	February 16	"Thrift Shop" †	Macklemore & Ryan Lewis featuring Wanz	
1022	February 23	"Thrift Shop" †	Macklemore & Ryan Lewis featuring Wanz	
1023	March 2	"Harlem Shake"	Baauer	
1023	March 9	"Harlem Shake"	Baauer	
1023	March 16	"Harlem Shake"	Baauer	
1023	March 23	"Harlem Shake"	Baauer	
1023	March 30	"Harlem Shake"	Baauer	
re	April 6	"Thrift Shop" †	Macklemore & Ryan Lewis featuring Wanz	
re	April 13	"Thrift Shop" †	Macklemore & Ryan Lewis featuring Wanz	
1024	April 20	"When I Was Your Man"	Bruno Mars	
1025	April 27	"Just Give Me a Reason"	Pink featuring Nate Ruess	
1025	May 4	"Just Give Me a Reason"	Pink featuring Nate Ruess	
1025	May 11	"Just Give Me a Reason"	Pink featuring Nate Ruess	
1026	May 18	"Can't Hold Us"	Macklemore & Ryan Lewis featuring Ray Dalton	
1026	May 25	"Can't Hold Us"	Macklemore & Ryan Lewis featuring Ray Dalton	
1026	June 1	"Can't Hold Us"	Macklemore & Ryan Lewis featuring Ray Dalton	
1026	June 8	"Can't Hold Us"	Macklemore & Ryan Lewis featuring Ray Dalton	
1026	June 15	"Can't Hold Us"	Macklemore & Ryan Lewis featuring Ray Dalton	
1027	June 22	"Blurred Lines"	Robin Thicke featuring T.I. and Pharrell	
1027	June 29	"Blurred Lines"	Robin Thicke featuring T.I. and Pharrell	
1027	July 6	"Blurred Lines"	Robin Thicke featuring T.I. and Pharrell	
1027	July 13	"Blurred Lines"	Robin Thicke featuring T.I. and Pharrell	
1027	July 20	"Blurred Lines"	Robin Thicke featuring T.I. and Pharrell	
1027	July 27	"Blurred Lines"	Robin Thicke featuring T.I. and Pharrell	
1027	August 3	"Blurred Lines"	Robin Thicke featuring T.I. and Pharrell	
1027	August 10	"Blurred Lines"	Robin Thicke featuring T.I. and Pharrell	
1027	August 17	"Blurred Lines"	Robin Thicke featuring T.I. and Pharrell	
1027	August 24	"Blurred Lines"	Robin Thicke featuring T.I. and Pharrell	
1027	August 31	"Blurred Lines"	Robin Thicke featuring T.I. and Pharrell	
1027	September 7	"Blurred Lines"	Robin Thicke featuring T.I. and Pharrell	
1028	September 14	"Roar"	Katy Perry	
1028	September 21	"Roar"	Katy Perry	
1029	September 28	"Wrecking Ball"	Miley Cyrus	
1029	October 5	"Wrecking Ball"	Miley Cyrus	
1030	October 12	"Royals"	Lorde	
1030	October 19	"Royals"	Lorde	
1030	October 26	"Royals"	Lorde	
1030	November 2	"Royals"	Lorde	
1030	November 9	"Royals"	Lorde	
1030	November 16	"Royals"	Lorde	
1030	November 23	"Royals"	Lorde	
1030	November 30	"Royals"	Lorde	
1030	December 7	"Royals"	Lorde	
re	December 14	"Wrecking Ball"	Miley Cyrus	
1031	December 21	"The Monster"	Eminem featuring Rihanna	
1031	December 28	"The Monster"	Eminem featuring Rihanna	

== Number-one artists ==
List of number-one artists by total weeks at number one
Position	Artist	Weeks at No. 1
1	Robin Thicke	12
1	T.I.	12
1	Pharrell	12
4	Macklemore & Ryan Lewis	11
5	Lorde	9
6	Wanz	6
7	Bruno Mars	5
7	Baauer	5
7	Ray Dalton	5
10	Pink	3
10	Nate Ruess	3
10	Miley Cyrus	3
13	Katy Perry	2
13	Eminem	2
13	Rihanna	2

== See also ==
- 2013 in American music
- List of Billboard 200 number-one albums of 2013
- List of Billboard Hot 100 top-ten singles in 2013
- List of Billboard Hot 100 number-one singles of the 2010s
