= When I Was Your Man =

2013 single by Bruno Mars

Single by Bruno Mars

from the album Unorthodox Jukebox
- Released: January 15, 2013
- Studio: Levcon (Los Angeles, California)
- Genre: Pop
- Length: 3:34
- Label: Atlantic
- Songwriters: Bruno Mars; Philip Lawrence; Ari Levine; Andrew Wyatt
- Producer: The Smeezingtons

Bruno Mars singles chronology
"Locked Out of Heaven" (2012)	"When I Was Your Man" (2013)	"Treasure" (2013)

Music video
- "When I Was Your Man" on YouTube

"When I Was Your Man" is a song by American singer and songwriter Bruno Mars from his second studio album, Unorthodox Jukebox (2012). Atlantic Records released the song as the third promotional single and as the second official single, taken from the album, to mainstream radio in the United States on January 15, 2013. "When I Was Your Man" was written by Mars, Philip Lawrence, Ari Levine and Andrew Wyatt. The former three produced the track under the name the Smeezingtons.

The song is a piano ballad in which the singer reflects on how his pride and selfishness resulted in him losing his girlfriend, and expresses hope that her new partner will offer her the love and devotion he failed to provide. "When I Was Your Man" received mostly positive reviews from music critics, who generally praised Mars's vocal prowess. It topped the US Billboard Hot 100, and reached the top ten on the singles chart of Australia, Canada, Netherlands, New Zealand, and the United Kingdom. It was certified eleven times platinum by the Recording Industry Association of America (RIAA), diamond by Music Canada (MC), as well as seven times platinum by the Recorded Music NZ (RMNZ). "When I Was Your Man" was the world's eighth best-selling digital single of 2013, with sales of 8.3 million copies.

Cameron Duddy and Mars directed the accompanying music video. It portrays Mars as a "lonely balladeer" in sunglasses, sitting at a piano with a half-full glass of whiskey atop it. Critics resoundingly complimented the simplicity of the video. The song has been covered by other artists, including Mike Ward, who released a studio version of the song after he performed it on The Voice UK. Ward's cover peaked at number 60 in the UK Singles Chart. "When I Was Your Man" was also added to the soundtrack of the Brazilian soap opera Amor à Vida. Mars has performed the song on all his tours since 2013. The song won "Favorite Hit" at the 2013 Premios Juventud and was nominated for Best Pop Solo Performance at the 56th Annual Grammy Awards.

== Writing and production ==
While working on the album, Bruno Mars said: "I'm never singing another ballad again," but that came from the gut – it's the most honest, real thing I've ever sung". "When there are no safe bets, that's when I feel my blood move." He also shared how important the lyrics to this song are for him when he posted a photograph of Unorthodox Jukebox's artwork via his Twitter account. "Soon you guys will hear a song I wrote called When I Was Your Man. I've never been this nervous. Can't explain it". Philip Lawrence explained the inspiration of the song: "I think Bruno and I are both huge fans of older music, like Billy Joel and Elton John. We always loved those moments where you can sit at the piano and emote. Those intimate moments when an artist is so naked and vulnerable; you can't help but be drawn to it. We always wanted to find a stripped down song like that, which is how that song came to be. The subject matter was real life; Bruno had experienced that, so we tried to say it in the best and catchiest way we could."

"When I Was Your Man" was written by Mars, Lawrence, Ari Levine and Andrew Wyatt, while production was handled by the former three production-team, the Smeezingtons. Mars played the piano, while the recording was done by Levine at Levcon Studios in Los Angeles, California. Charles Moniz was responsible for providing additional engineering to the recording. It was mixed at Larrabee Sound Studios in Hollywood by Manny Marroquin. It was mastered by David Kutch at The Mastering Place.

== Composition and lyrics ==
"When I Was Your Man"
A 20-second sample of "When I Was Your Man", where Mars sings about a lost love, while piano is playing on the background.

"When I Was Your Man" is written in the key of C major. Mars's vocals range from the low note of G_{3} to the high note of C_{5} with chord progressions Am–C–Dm–G–G_{7}–C (verse) and F–G–C (chorus). The pop piano ballad finds Mars singing about a pre-fame heartbreak as he regrets letting his woman get away. It starts with a rolling piano riff; unto a nearly scat "vocal cadence": "Same bed but it feels just a little bit bigger now / Our song on the radio but it don't sound the same", as he laments the "single state" he created for himself. Next, he sings of his failings; to do right by his woman, "I shoulda bought you flowers / And held your hand / Shoulda gave you all my hours / When I had the chance". Its title phrase re-emerges in the final chorus, juxtaposed by Bruno from all the things he "shoulda" done, into things he hopes his ex's new man will do; concluding: "Do all of the things I should have done / When I was your man". In an interview to Rolling Stone, Mars revealed, while reluctant, that he wrote the song for his girlfriend, model Jessica Caban, when he was worried about losing her. In contrast with the song, Mars and Caban stayed together. Mars also said, in the interview, that he finds it difficult to perform the song; saying: "You're bringing up all these old emotions again," and that: "It's just like bleeding!"

For Andrew Unterberger of Pop Dust, the song "starts out dangerously close to 'Drops of Jupiter' territory, but luckily, there are no fried chicken or soy latte lyrics to be found here." He also noted that "'When I Was Your Man' goes minimal with the musical accompaniment, featuring just Bruno and his piano, sounding halfway between an Alicia Keys ballad and Prince's "How Come U Don't Call Me Anymore?"." Andy Gill of The Independent called it a "McCartney-esque piano ballad." Melinda Newman of HitFix thought that the song "sounds like a cross between Stevie Wonder and Elton John," also seeing "a touch of Michael Jackson" in his delivery. Sam Lansky of Idolator agreed, writing that "while evoking Elton John, the track sounds like it was recorded live in a piano bar, with audible background noise, like the spooling of film on a projector." Robert Copsey of Digital Spy said that Mars lists everything he should have done for the one he loved before she broke up with him. Maura Johnston from Rolling Stone finds Mars's "pouring his heart out with enough passion to wonder if he's hoping to turn back the clock via pure emotionalism." The lyrics find Mars regretful of not giving attention to his ex, as he "should have bought her" flowers and treated her better, as he reflects on their past relationship wishing for her new man to treat her better.

== Release ==
"When I Was Your Man" was released as the third and final promotional single taken from Unorthodox Jukebox, on December 3, 2012. Later, it was reported by Mars that "Young Girls" was scheduled to be the second single from the album. However, a week later, while performing "When I Was Your Man" on a TV show, he announced that it would be the second official single from the album. To confirm the news, Mediabase also published that the song will be soon released to radio stations.

Atlantic Records serviced "When I Was Your Man" to contemporary hit radio in the United States on January 15, 2013. The single was released on the United Kingdom on February 10, 2013, via digital download. On March 8, 2013, Warner Music Group sent the song for radio airplay in Italy. It was released as a CD single in Germany, Austria, and Switzerland on April 5, 2013.

== Reception ==
=== Critical ===
The song has received generally positive reviews from most music critics. Sam Lanksy of Idolator gave the song a favorable review, calling it "an emotional ballad that shows off Mars' sweet vocals." Lansky also praised it, naming it "another exceptional offering from Unorthodox Jukebox, which is shaping up to be one of the year's best pop releases." Andrew Unterberger of Pop Dust gave the song a rating of 3.5 out of 5 stars, commenting that 'When I Was Your Man' is "a much more satisfying, less ostentatious ballad than 'Young Girls'— though maybe the lyrics are a little too clichéd to result in a classic soul ballad the way Bruno seems to be going for." However, he praised Mars, which according to him, "nobody puts a song like this over quite like him, and when he hits the big high note on the song's bridge, it's about as striking a moment as you're likely to hear on a pop record this year. It might be a little too perfect to be as devastating as a song like 'Someone Like You', but it might be a big hit just the same, and it's guaranteed to absolutely slay in a live set." Melissa Maerz of Entertainment Weekly was positive, writing that "Old-school charm still gets Mars the furthest, and the best thing here is the classic torch song 'When I Was Your Man', which finds him at the piano listing all the ways he wronged an ex. 'Caused a good, strong woman like you to walk out my life,' he cries in his Sinatra-smooth tenor, oozing charm. Maybe he's a jerk. But he's the jerk that girl's going home with tonight." Johnston praised Mars's vocals as "strong yet sweet".

Jon Caramanica of The New York Times commented that "The piano tells it all on this song, which is one of the most certain on the album." Later, he stated, "If this isn't the beginning of the Billy Joel comeback, people should lose their jobs." Jason Lipshut of Billboard wrote that "it will make for a killer lighters-in-the-air moment in concert. Although it's not quite an Alicia Keys-esque powerhouse, 'When I Was Your Man' smartly allows Mars to momentarily remove his fedora and bare his soul." The Arizona Republic's Ed Masley viewed "When I Was Your Man" as one of Unorthodox Jukebox best tracks and described it as "stripped-down soul". Jim Farber of New York Daily News wrote that in the ballad, "he matches his bravura performance to a tune stirring enough to inspire aspiring stars on the 'X Factor/Idol' axis for years to come." Melinda Newman of HitFix called it a "beautiful piano ballad," writing that "There's not a lot of embellishment, there are no samples and there is not a wasted note." Sandy Cohen from the Associated Press wrote that "Mars is at his best on the bare piano ballad 'When I Was Your Man'." Andrew Chan of Slant Magazine gave a mixed review for the song, writing that "his melody and lyrics end up sounding as slight as they did before— an embarrassment for an artist who's staked so much of his image on sturdy, old-fashioned songcraft." Digital Spy's Robert Copsey preferred "Locked Out of Heaven" to "When I Was Your Man", despite being "a kind gesture and all".

=== Awards and recognition ===
In 2013, "When I Was Your Man" won "Favorite Hit" at the 2013 Premios Juventud. It was nominated for Break-Up Song at the 2013 Teen Choice Awards and for That's My Jam at the 2013 NewNowNext Awards. In 2014, the ballad received a nomination for Best Pop Solo Performance at the 56th Annual Grammy Awards and it was also nominated for Favorite Song at the 2014 People's Choice Awards. The single was one of the several winners of the 2014 ASCAP Pop Music Awards for Most Performed Songs, as well as, one of the Top 10 Gold International Gold Songs at the RTHK International Pop Poll Awards. It was the fourth most played song on radio, the eighth most played on Top 40 and on Adult Contemporary radios, according to Nielsen SoundScan Mediabase ranked the song as the 15th most played on Top 40 radio stations in 2013. In the UK, "When I Was Your Man" was the tenth pop track most played in 2013.

== Commercial performance ==
=== North America ===
"When I Was Your Man" was released on iTunes as a promotional single, leading the song to debut at number 69 on the Billboard Hot 100 chart. The single entered the top 10 the week of February 13, 2013, charting at number nine, becoming Mars's 10th top 10 single. At that time, "Locked Out of Heaven" was at number two, and thus Mars became the first male artist to place two titles as a lead act on the Billboard Hot 100 top 10 simultaneously since "Grenade" and "Just the Way You Are" doubled up for eight consecutive weeks. On February 27, 2013, the song jumped from number 8 to number 3 on the Hot 100 with "Airplay Gainer" honors for a seventh week in a row, tying it with Rihanna's "Rude Boy" (2010), T-Pain's "Buy U a Drank (Shawty Snappin')," featuring Yung Joc (2007), and Beyonce's "Baby Boy," featuring Sean Paul (2003), for the longest streak dating to the award's launch. The song reached number one on the U.S. Billboard Hot 100, in its 16th week after being discounted to 69 cents on the iTunes music store, making it Mars's slowest-peaking single. It also became the second number one song in the charts to feature exclusively piano and vocals after Adele's "Someone like You" in 2011. With "When I Was Your Man" topping the Billboard Hot 100, Mars reached the same mark as Diddy, Ludacris, Prince and Lionel Richie. Elvis Presley was the only male who reached five leaders more quickly.

On the Radio Songs chart, "When I Was Your Man" peaked at number one, becoming Mars's fifth number-one on the chart. Among men, Mars tied 50 Cent and trailed Usher, Ludacris and Kanye West, the latter two with six number-ones and the former with seven, since the chart's 1990 start. At that time, Mariah Carey led the list with 11 songs peaking at number one on the chart. On the Mainstream Top 40 chart, "When I Was Your Man" peaked at number 1, giving Mars the highest total among solo males of number one songs (six) on the chart (only Katy Perry and Rihanna lead all acts with eleven number one's each). After a year, Justin Timberlake's "Not a Bad Thing" passed Mars for most number one songs on the Mainstream Top 40. It became the ninth best-selling song of 2013 in the US with 3,928,000 downloads. As of January 2014, it has sold over 4,123,000 copies in the US. It was certified eleven times platinum by the Recording Industry Association of America (RIAA).

On the Canadian Hot 100, "When I Was Your Man" peaked at number three and it topped the Canadian CHR/Top 40 and Hot AC charts. It is certified diamond by Music Canada (MC).

The popularity of "When I Was Your Man" resurged in January 2023, after Miley Cyrus released the single "Flowers", which lyrics interpolated the song's chorus. In the week ending on January 19 the song rose from 4.5 million to 5.3 million in weekly streams in the United States, a 19.5 percent gain.

=== International ===
"When I Was Your Man" peaked at number 2 in the United Kingdom and it was certified four times platinum by the British Phonographic Industry (BPI). On the Danish Singles Chart, the single debuted at number 23 on February 15, 2013 and it first reached a high point of number four on March 8, 2013. It was certified four times platinum by the IFPI Denmark. "When I Was Your Man" entered the New Zealand Singles Chart at number 26 on January 1, 2013. After three weeks the song entered the top ten, at its highest peak, number four, remaining for two non-consecutive weeks. It has received a seven-platinum certification from the Recording Industry Association of New Zealand (RMNZ). In Australia, the song debuted at number 44 on the ARIA Charts week of December 23, 2012. In its fifth week, the song peaked at number six, becoming his sixth top-ten single in Australia. It was certified six times platinum by the Australian Recording Industry Association (ARIA). In South Korea, the track peaked at number 7 on the "International Download Chart". It was the eighth best selling digital single of 2013 with sales of 8.3 million copies.

== Music video ==
=== Development and synopsis ===
The music video for the song was directed by Cameron Duddy and Mars, and was released February 5, 2013. The video portrays the taping of a TV special, resembling a CRT variety show. Mars plays a lonely balladeer on the ivories while sitting in front of a piano with sunglasses donned and a half-full glass of whiskey atop his instrument, wearing a suit with a carnation boutonnière, while he keeps reminding himself of what he could have done to keep his lover. The video is based on 70's vibe and retro effects. The set and the idea of the video is similar to the one used for Belinda Carlisle's "Love in the Key of C" (1997).

=== Reception ===
Rolling Stone, called the video "powerful" and a found "the final crescendo reaching a breaking point of true sorrow". Chris Payne, from Billboard called the music video "somber". Nicole Sia of Spin praised "the song's visual". According to Lansky of Idolator, "the clip, which is basically just Mars...sitting and singing at the piano...works". He continued, "While he certainly could have gone for something a little more high-concept, the clip's elegant framing just draws attention to...the song".

== Live performances ==
"When I Was Your Man" was performed live for the first time on the season three finale of US The Voice. Mars performed the song back by two piano players. Rap-Up considered that Mars "rocked the stage" during his performance, while EW's Hillary Bussis found the crowd to "go crazy" because of his lyrics or persuading Mars "to ditch those Cee Lo shades". He also performed the song on Jimmy Kimmel Live! on January 10, 2013. The performance had Mars with piano accompaniment. Kyle McGovern of Spin wrote that "he swells and contracts with every new regret and heartbroken epiphany." McGovern also stated, "Mars might still be locked out of heaven, but it sounds like he's getting closer to the angels." "When I Was Your Man" was performed at The Jonathan Ross Show after an interview, on March 3, 2013. The song was performed at season five the finale of Let's Dance for Comic Relief, on March 9, 2013. On April 3, 2013, Mars performed the song live on The Ellen DeGeneres Show. Carl Williott called the performance "flawless".

It was sung on the show Vivement Dimanche, on April 7, 2013. On May 26, 2013, the single was performed at the Radio 1's Big Weekend. "When I Was Your Man" was sung on The Moonshine Jungle Tour (2013–2015), on his debut concert residency, Bruno Mars at The Chelsea, Las Vegas (2013–2015), and during the 24K Magic World Tour (2017–2018). The song was part of the setlist of An Evening with Silk Sonic at Park MGM (2022), a concert residency performed by Mars with Anderson .Paak, as Silk Sonic. They performed it as a medley of "Put on a Smile" of Silk Sonic's debut studio album An Evening with Silk Sonic (2021), and "Make It Better", a song included on .Paak's fourth studio album Ventura (2019) featuring Smokey Robinson. The track was part of the Bruno Mars Live (2022-2024) setlist.

== Cover versions and usage in media ==
In 2013, The Voice UK contestant Mike Ward performed the song during the competition. A studio version of his performance was released and peaked at number 60 in the UK Singles Chart. Country singer Thomas Rhett recorded a cover of the song as a 'thank-you' to fans. The song was released for sale on February 3, 2015 and it debuted at No. 27 on the Hot Country Songs chart and despite failing to reach the Billboard Hot 100, it peaked inside of the Bubbling Under Hot 100, which acts as an extension of the former chart, peaking at number 7 there.

"When I Was Your Man" was included on the soundtrack of the Brazilian soap opera Amor à Vida.

In January 2023, American singer Miley Cyrus released the single "Flowers"; its chorus is a paraphrase of the one on "When I Was Your Man". Tempo Music Investments, which holds partial copyright over "When I Was Your Man", filed a copyright infringement suit against Cyrus and fellow "Flowers" co-writers Gregory Aldae Hein and Michael Pollack on September 16, 2024.

== Track listing ==
CD Single
No.	Title	Length
1.	"When I Was Your Man"	3:36
2.	"When I Was Your Man" (Cazzette's Answering Machine Mix)	5:04

== Personnel ==
Credits adapted from the liner notes of Unorthodox Jukebox.

- Bruno Mars – lead vocals, songwriting, piano
- Philip Lawrence – songwriting
- Ari Levine – songwriting, recording
- Andrew Wyatt – songwriting
- The Smeezingtons – production
- Charles Moniz – additional engineer
- Manny Marroquin – mixing
- David Kutch – mastering

== Charts ==
=== Weekly charts ===
List of chart positions
Chart (2013–2014)	Peak position
Australia (ARIA)	6
Austria (Ö3 Austria Top 40)	11
Belgium (Ultratop 50 Flanders)	7
Belgium (Ultratop 50 Wallonia)	13
Brazil (Crowley Broadcast Analysis)	9
Canada Hot 100 (Billboard)	3
Canada AC (Billboard)	2
Canada CHR/Top 40 (Billboard)	1
Canada Hot AC (Billboard)	1
Czech Republic Airplay (ČNS IFPI)	4
Denmark (Tracklisten)	4
Euro Digital Song Sales (Billboard)	3
Finland (Suomen virallinen lista)	13
France (SNEP)	9
Germany (GfK)	23
Hungary (Editors' Choice Top 40)	31
Iceland (RÚV)	46
Ireland (IRMA)	6
Israel International Airplay (Media Forest)	11
Italy (FIMI)	19
Japan Hot 100 (Billboard)	60
Lebanon Airplay (Lebanese Top 20)	9
Luxembourg Digital Song Sales (Billboard)	12
Mexico (Billboard Mexican Airplay)	17
Mexico Anglo (Monitor Latino)	6
Netherlands (Dutch Top 40)	7
Netherlands (Single Top 100)	6
New Zealand (Recorded Music NZ)	4
Norway (VG-lista)	12
Portugal Digital Songs Sales (Billboard)	8
Romania (Airplay 100)	51
Scottish Singles Sales (Official Charts)	10
Slovakia Airplay (ČNS IFPI)	3
South Africa Airplay (EMA)	7
South Korea International (Gaon)	7
Spain (Promusicae)	22
Sweden (Sverigetopplistan)	16
Switzerland (Schweizer Hitparade)	12
UK Singles (Official Charts)	2
US Billboard Hot 100	1
US Adult Contemporary (Billboard)	1
US Adult Pop Airplay (Billboard)	1
US Dance Airplay (Billboard)	19
US Latin Airplay (Billboard)	19
US Pop Airplay (Billboard)	1
US Rhythmic Airplay (Billboard)	4
Venezuela Pop/Rock General (Record Report)	2

List of chart positions
Chart (2021–2024)	Peak position
Brazil Hot 100 (Billboard)	93
Global 200 (Billboard)	70
Indonesia (Billboard)	20
Malaysia International (RIM)	17
Philippines (Philippines Hot 100)	77
Portugal (AFP)	118
Singapore (RIAS)	19
South Korea (Circle)	109

List of chart position for Mike Ward version
Chart (2013)	Peak position
UK Singles (Official Charts)	60

List of chart positions for Thomas Rhett version
Chart (2015)	Peak position
US Bubbling Under Hot 100 (Billboard)	7
US Hot Country Songs (Billboard)	27

=== Year-end charts ===
List of chart positions
Chart (2013)	Position
Australia (ARIA)	17
Belgium (Ultratop 50 Flanders)	33
Belgium (Ultratop 50 Wallonia)	32
Brazil (Crowley)	8
Canada (Canadian Hot 100)	13
France (SNEP)	27
Germany (Official German Charts)	89
Ireland (IRMA)	18
Israel International Airplay (Media Forest)	49
Italy (FIMI)	59
Netherlands (Dutch Top 40)	26
Netherlands (Single Top 100)	31
New Zealand (Recorded Music NZ)	10
Sweden (Sverigetopplistan)	52
Switzerland (Schweizer Hitparade)	50
UK Singles (OCC)	16
US Billboard Hot 100	8
US Mainstream Top 40 (Billboard)	14
US Adult Contemporary (Billboard)	5
US Adult Top 40 (Billboard)	14
US Rhythmic (Billboard)	22

List of chart position
Chart (2023)	Position
Global 200 (Billboard)	122

List of chart positions
Chart (2024)	Position
Global 200 (Billboard)	165
Portugal (AFP)	184

== Certifications ==
List of certifications
Region	Certification	Certified units/sales
Australia (ARIA)	6× Platinum	420,000^{‡}
Belgium (BRMA)	Gold	15,000^{*}
Canada (Music Canada)	Diamond	800,000^{‡}
Denmark (IFPI Danmark)	4× Platinum	360,000^{‡}
France (SNEP)	Gold	75,000^{*}
Germany (BVMI)	3× Gold	450,000^{‡}
Italy (FIMI)	2× Platinum	100,000^{‡}
Mexico (AMPROFON)	2× Platinum	120,000^{*}
New Zealand (RMNZ)	7× Platinum	210,000^{‡}
Portugal (AFP)	6× Platinum	60,000^{‡}
Spain (Promusicae)	4× Platinum	240,000^{‡}
Sweden (GLF)	Platinum	40,000^{‡}
Switzerland (IFPI Switzerland)	Platinum	30,000^{^}
United Kingdom (BPI)	4× Platinum	2,400,000^{‡}
United States (RIAA)	11× Platinum	11,000,000^{‡}
Steaming
Denmark (IFPI Danmark)	2× Platinum	3,600,000^{†}
^{*} Sales figures based on certification alone.^{^} Shipments figures based on certification alone.^{‡} Sales+streaming figures based on certification alone.^{†} Streaming-only figures based on certification alone.

== Release history ==
=== Promotional release ===
List of release history, showing region, date, format and label
Region	Date	Format	Label	Ref.
Various	December 3, 2012	Digital download (iTunes countdown single)	Atlantic	

=== Single release ===
List of release history, showing region(s), date(s), format(s) and label(s)
Region	Date	Format	Label	Ref.
United States	January 15, 2013	Contemporary hit radio	Atlantic	
United Kingdom	February 10, 2013	Digital download	Unknown	
Italy	March 8, 2013	Radio airplay	Warner	
Germany	April 5, 2013	CD single	Atlantic	
Austria	April 5, 2013	CD single	Atlantic	
Switzerland	April 5, 2013	CD single	Atlantic	

== See also ==
- List of best-selling singles
- List of best-selling singles in Australia
- List of best-selling singles in the United States
- List of Hot 100 number-one singles of 2013 (U.S.)
- List of Mainstream Top 40 number-one hits of 2013 (U.S.)
- List of Adult Top 40 number-one songs of the 2010s
- List of number-one adult contemporary singles of 2013 (U.S.)
