= The Finatticz =

American hip hop group

- Origin: Los Angeles, California, United States
- Genres: Hip hop
- Label: EOne Music
- Members: Jayarah the Truth; EZ the Great; Killa F Supernigga; Nyce; Yc Lopez

The Finatticz, stylized as The FiNATTiCZ, are an American hip hop group from South Central Los Angeles, California best known for their 2012 single "Don't Drop That Thun Thun".

== History ==
The Finatticz members Jayarah the Truth and EZ the Great met as krumpers while they attended Alexander Fleming Middle School in Lomita, California. They first began making music with Killa F Supernigga after meeting him at a show in Hollywood; Killa then introduced them to Nyce, with whom he had previously collaborated. In 2009, the quartet recorded a song initially entitled "Don't Drop That". The group members had written its lyrics, while producer Payso B, Yc Lopez created the song's beat. Group member EZ the Great claimed the group "recorded this song in 15 minutes" and described the song's genesis as follows: "I remember we recorded it during the day, and that night we played it for a huge party at my girl O Titty's house...Everyone told us to turn it up!" Soon the song's fans began referring to the song as "The Thun Thun Song" due to the lyrics of its chorus, and it eventually was released under the title "Don't Drop That Thun Thun".

In 2012, a remix which featured Tyga was released, and soon after Payso B played the song for Ray J, who brought the Finatticz to the label EOne Music. The label signed them for the single release, and the song began receiving heavy airplay on local Los Angeles stations such as Power 106. A short video clip of the song, soundtracking a few seconds of twerking, was uploaded to Vine in July 2013 and went viral. This propelled the song to #35 on the Billboard Hot 100 and #10 on the Hot Hip-Hop/R&B Songs chart; the song also reached #74 on the Canadian Hot 100.

In 2012, Jayarah the Truth served a prison sentence for possession of Ecstasy. Killa F Supernigga has also been convicted of accessory after the fact to murder and attempted murder.

In 2016, The Finatticz EZ and Killa F has started working again after hooking up with iMG Recordings CEO Rick Robinson .

== Members ==
- James Dunn/Killa F Supernigga
- Anthony Brown/EZ the Great
- Derwan Wade/G5yelikethis
- Tyrone Revis/Jayarah Millz
