= Red Nose =

Single by Sage the Gemini

from the album Remember Me
- Released: March 19, 2013
- Recorded: 2012
- Genre: Hyphy; West Coast hip hop; hip hop
- Length: 3:13 (Explicit Version); 3:31 (Clean Version)
- Label: Black Money; Empire; Republic
- Songwriter: Dominic Wynn Woods
- Producer: Woods

Sage the Gemini singles chronology
"Red Nose" (2013)	"Gas Pedal" (2013)

Music video
- "Red Nose" on YouTube

"Red Nose" is a song by American rapper Sage the Gemini from his debut album Remember Me. The song was released as his debut single on March 19, 2013. It was a minor hit on the Billboard Hot 100, peaking at number 52 but fared better on the Hot R&B/Hip-Hop Songs and Hot Rap Songs charts at numbers 14 and 10, respectively.

== Music video ==
A music video for the song was released on June 10, 2013. As of April 2020, it has over 130 million views on YouTube.

== Commercial performance ==
"Red Nose" debuted at number 62 on US Billboard Hot 100 for the week of August 3, 2013. Eight weeks later, the song peaked at number 52 for the week of September 28, 2013 and spent a total of twenty weeks on the chart. As of June 1, 2014, the song has sold 639,046 digital copies in the United States, according to Nielsen SoundScan.

== Chart performance ==
=== Weekly charts ===
Chart (2013–14)	Peak position
US Billboard Hot 100	52
US Hot R&B/Hip-Hop Songs (Billboard)	14
US Hot Rap Songs (Billboard)	10
US Rhythmic Airplay (Billboard)	11

=== Year-end charts ===
Chart (2013)	Position
US Hot R&B/Hip-Hop Songs (Billboard)	46
US Streaming Songs (Billboard)	48
Chart (2014)	Position
US Hot R&B/Hip-Hop Songs (Billboard)	100

== Certifications ==
Region	Certification	Certified units/sales
New Zealand (RMNZ)	Gold	15,000^{‡}
United States (RIAA)	2× Platinum	2,000,000^{‡}
^{‡} Sales+streaming figures based on certification alone.
