= Love Me (Lil Wayne song) =

Single by Lil Wayne featuring Drake and Future

from the album I Am Not a Human Being II
- Released: January 18, 2013
- Recorded: 2012
- Genre: Dirty rap; trap
- Length: 4:15
- Label: Young Money; Cash Money; Republic
- Songwriters: Dwayne Carter; Aubrey Graham; Nayvadius Wilburn; Michael Williams; Asheton Hogan
- Producers: Mike WiLL Made It; A+

Lil Wayne singles chronology
"Hello" (2012)	"Love Me" (2013)	"All That (Lady)" (2013)

Drake singles chronology
"Poetic Justice" (2012)	"Love Me" (2013)	"Right Here" (2013)

Future singles chronology
"Neva End" (2012)	"Love Me" (2013)	"Bugatti" (2013)

Music video
- "Love Me" on YouTube

"Love Me" is a song by American rapper Lil Wayne featuring Drake and Future from the former's tenth studio album I Am Not a Human Being II (2013). Written by the artists alongside producers Mike WiLL Made It and A+, it was released on January 18, 2013, by Young Money Entertainment, Cash Money Records, and Republic Records as the second single from the album. It also appeared for free download on the Rich Gang mixtape Rich Gang: Allstars (2014).

The song became Lil Wayne's 18th top ten hit, peaking at number nine on the US Billboard Hot 100. It became Future's first top ten hit on the chart. The song spent 20 weeks on French Singles Chart and peaked at number 27, becoming Wayne's second highest-charting song as a lead artist since "Mirror" (with Bruno Mars).

The song, described as "sexual, braggadocios, [and] heavily Auto-Tuned", serves as an ode to Wayne's polyamory. Despite commercial success in the United States and France, "Love Me" was largely panned by critics.

== Background ==
The song leaked online in late December 2012 when Cash Money's in-house DJ's, DJ Stevie J and E-Feezy premiered I Am Not a Human Being II's lead single on December 29, 2012. The artwork for the single was designed by Kanye West, who had a longtime desire to do so for a Wayne record. Regarding his involvement, Wayne told The Times-Picayune:

"[Kanye] said, you know, man, let me do your cover. I saw the cover and I approved it…He had an explanation behind it - he said, he chose the moth butterfly thing because it has so many different stages of life, and it goes through so many forms and changes, and no one can figure it out, and it's always beautiful."

On January 30, 2013, an animated version of the cover was released.

On December 23, 2013, the songs producer, Mike WiLL Made It released the original version on his mixtape, #MikeWillBeenTrill, which omitted Wayne and was only performed by Future and Drake—the former of whom replaced Wayne's two verses.

== Music video ==
The music video was directed by Hannah Lux Davis and shot on January 30, 2013, in Los Angeles. The teaser trailer was released on February 12, 2013. The music video premiered on February 14, 2013, on MTV Jams. As of June 2025, it has over 600 million views on YouTube. In France, despite the success of the song in the country, the music video accompanying was broadcast after 10pm following sexual scenes, images of submissive women, sadomasochistic content and dark theme. The music video was then broadcast with a warning Not advised to kids under 10 years old or 12 years old or without warning (depending on channels).

== Charts ==
=== Weekly charts ===
Chart (2013)	Peak position
Australia (ARIA)	92
Belgium (Ultratip Bubbling Under Flanders)	3
Belgium (Ultratop Flanders Urban)	12
Belgium (Ultratip Bubbling Under Wallonia)	3
Canada Hot 100 (Billboard)	49
France (SNEP)	27
Germany (GfK)	93
Netherlands (Single Top 100)	79
Switzerland (Schweizer Hitparade)	72
UK Singles (Official Charts)	44
UK Hip Hop/R&B (Official Charts)	9
US Billboard Hot 100	9
US Hot R&B/Hip-Hop Songs (Billboard)	4
US Rhythmic Airplay (Billboard)	6

=== Year-end charts ===
Chart (2013)	Position
France (SNEP)	135
US Billboard Hot 100	39
US Hot R&B/Hip-Hop Songs (Billboard)	10
US Rhythmic (Billboard)	20

== Certifications ==
Region	Certification	Certified units/sales
Australia (ARIA)	Gold	35,000^{‡}
Spain (Promusicae)	Gold	50,000^{‡}
United Kingdom (BPI)	Platinum	600,000^{‡}
United States (RIAA)	Diamond	10,000,000^{‡}
^{‡} Sales+streaming figures based on certification alone.

== Release history ==
Country	Date	Format	Label
United States	January 18, 2013	Digital download	Cash Money
United Kingdom	January 30, 2013	Digital download	Cash Money
