= Kesha discography =

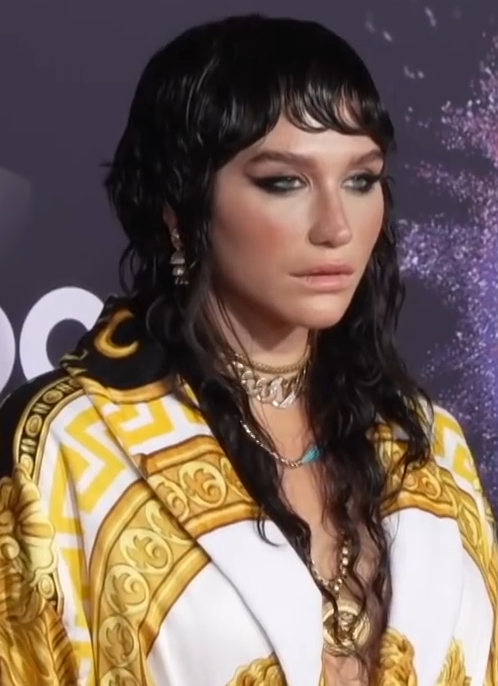
- Kesha in 2019
- Studio albums: 6
- Extended plays: 3
- Singles: 43
- Promotional singles: 16
- Reissued albums: 2
- Remixed albums: 2

American singer and songwriter Kesha has released six studio albums, three extended plays, 43 singles (including 12 as a featured artist), 16 promotional singles, two reissued albums, two remixed albums, and has made seven other guest appearances. She has a total of 77.5 million certified units in the United States according to the RIAA (Recording Industry Association of America). (Note: As of 2024, Kesha has accumulated 62 million certified record sales in the United States as a solo and lead act, including 54 million digital download and on-demand single certifications along with 8 million certified album units. She has also achieved an additional 15.5 million certified single certifications as of 2025 from her features with Pitbull, 3OH!3 and Macklemore, bringing her cumulative total to 77.5 million.)

Kesha made her international debut in early 2009, serving as a featured artist on Flo Rida's "Right Round". Despite being uncredited in the United States, the song went number one in the country for six consecutive weeks, broke the record for most first-week sales with 636,000 downloads, and became one of the best-selling songs of the digital era. Kesha's debut studio album, Animal, followed in January 2010 and topped the American, Canadian, and Greek charts. The record's lead single and Kesha's debut solo single, "Tik Tok" (2009), reached number one in fourteen countries and spent nine consecutive weeks atop the Billboard Hot 100, becoming the longest running number one single of 2010. The song has brought total sales of 14 million copies worldwide, therefore making it one of the best-selling digital singles of all time. Other singles from Animal, "Blah Blah Blah" (2010), "Your Love Is My Drug" (2010), and "Take It Off" (2010), experienced similar success, as did Kesha's features on 3OH!3's "My First Kiss" (2010) and Taio Cruz's "Dirty Picture" (2010). Kesha topped eight subcharts on Billboard's 2010 Year-End Chart, including the Top New Artist, Hot 100 Songs and Hot 100 Artists subcharts, and was named Billboard artist of the year. The commercial and critical success of the singer's first album led to the release of the extended play Cannibal in November 2010, which went double platinum in the US. Its lead single, "We R Who We R" (2010), reached the top ten in ten countries, including a number one debut in the US. "Blow" (2011) also managed to peak within the top ten of multiple countries. In March 2011, a remix album named I Am the Dance Commander + I Command You to Dance: The Remix Album was released and topped the Billboard Dance/Electronic Albums chart. The following month, after writing all of the lyrics of American singer Britney Spears' global smash "Till the World Ends", Kesha was featured on a remix of the track alongside Trinidadian rapper Nicki Minaj titled "the Femme Fatale remix". The remix propelled the single to the top five on the Canadian Hot 100 and the Billboard Hot 100.

Kesha's second studio album, Warrior, was made available for purchase in December 2012. It debuted at number six on the Billboard 200 chart. "Die Young" (2012) was selected as the record's lead single and peaked at number two in the United States, while charting in the top ten of eleven other countries. Followup singles "C'Mon" (2013) and "Crazy Kids" (2013) were released to moderate success. In October 2013, the singer was featured on Pitbull's single "Timber", which topped the charts in sixteen countries, including the Billboard Hot 100 in the United States. As of 2025, it has also since been certified 12× Platinum in the United States by the RIAA (Recording Industry Association of America), alongside her debut single "Tik Tok", for sales of 12 million units, earning Kesha two diamond certified singles in the country. According to the IFPI, it was also the sixth best-selling song of 2014 globally, selling 9.6 million digital-downloads.

In 2017, after a controversial legal battle with longtime producer Dr. Luke, Kesha's comeback single, "Praying", was released as the lead single for her third studio album, Rainbow, both of which were nominated at the 60th Annual Grammy Awards ceremony. "Praying" reached number one in Hong Kong, while Rainbow did so in the US and Canada. The same year, Kesha was featured on American rapper Macklemore's single "Good Old Days", which has been certified platinum in the US, Canada, and Australia.

In January 2020, Kesha released her fourth studio album High Road. It debuted at number seven on the Billboard 200, marking Kesha's fourth top-ten album on the chart. In May 2023, she released her fifth full-length album Gag Order. She released her sixth album, Period under her own label, Kesha Records, on July 4, 2025.

== Albums ==
=== Studio albums ===
List of studio albums, with selected details, chart positions, sales, and certifications
| Title | Studio album details | Peak chart positions | | | | | | | | | | Sales | Certifications |
| Title | Studio album details | US | AUS | AUT | BEL (FL) | CAN | GER | IRE | NZ | SCO | UK | Sales | Certifications |
|---|---|---|---|---|---|---|---|---|---|---|---|---|---|
| Animal | Released: January 1, 2010; Labels: RCA, Kemosabe; Formats: CD, LP, digital download, streaming | 1 | 4 | 4 | 32 | 1 | 7 | 8 | 6 | 7 | 8 | US: 1,470,000 (Note: Sales of Animal, Cannibal, I Am the Dance Commander + I Command You to Dance: The Remix Album and Warrior in the United States as of March 2016.) | RIAA: 4× Platinum; ARIA: 2× Platinum; BPI: Platinum; BVMI: Gold; IFPI AUT: Gold; IRMA: Gold; MC: 2× Platinum; RMNZ: 3× Platinum |
| Warrior | Released: November 30, 2012; Labels: RCA, Kemosabe; Formats: CD, LP, digital download, streaming | 6 | 12 | 44 | 117 | 10 | 81 | 64 | 30 | 52 | 60 | US: 350,000 | RIAA: Platinum; RMNZ: Platinum |
| Rainbow | Released: August 11, 2017; Labels: RCA, Kemosabe; Formats: CD, LP, digital download, streaming | 1 | 3 | 16 | 17 | 1 | 33 | 2 | 4 | 4 | 4 | US: 90,000 (Note: Sales of Rainbow in the United States as of August 2017.); CAN: 7,000 (Note: Sales of Rainbow in Canada as of August 2017.) | RIAA: Platinum; MC: Gold; RMNZ: Gold |
| High Road | Released: January 31, 2020; Labels: RCA, Kemosabe; Formats: CD, LP, digital download, streaming | 7 | 26 | — | 163 | 20 | — | 71 | — | 27 | 63 | US: 35,000 | |
| Gag Order | Released: May 19, 2023; Labels: RCA, Kemosabe; Formats: CD, LP, digital download, streaming | 168 | — | — | — | — | — | — | — | 80 | — (Note: Gag Order did not enter the UK Albums Chart, but peaked at number 45 on the UK Albums Sales Chart.) | | |
| Period | Released: July 4, 2025; Labels: Kesha Records; Formats: CD, LP, digital download, streaming | 17 | — | — | 155 | 76 | 84 | 88 | — | 2 | 43 | US: 15,500 | |
"—" denotes items which did not chart in that country.

=== Reissued albums ===
| Title | Album details | Peak chart positions | | |
| Title | Album details | AUT | NZ | KOR |
|---|---|---|---|---|
| Animal + Cannibal | Released: November 19, 2010; Labels: RCA, Kemosabe; Formats: CD, LP, digital download, streaming | 67 | 22 | 19 |
| Animal + Cannibal (15th Anniversary) | Released: November 21, 2025; Label: RCA; Formats: CD, LP, digital | — | — | — |

=== Remix albums ===
| Title | Album details | Peak chart positions | | | | | Sales |
| Title | Album details | US | US Dance | AUS | CAN | KOR | Sales |
|---|---|---|---|---|---|---|---|
| I Am the Dance Commander + I Command You to Dance: The Remix Album | Released: March 18, 2011; Labels: RCA, Kemosabe; Formats: CD, digital download, streaming | 36 | 1 | 46 | 37 | 84 | US: 118,000 |
| Animal + Cannibal - The Remix Album | Released: April 27, 2011; Labels: RCA, Kemosabe; Formats: CD, digital download, streaming | — | — | — | — | — | |

== Extended plays ==
| Title | Extended play details | Peak chart positions | | | | | | Sales | Certifications |
| Title | Extended play details | US | US Dance | AUT | CAN | IRE | NZ | Sales | Certifications |
|---|---|---|---|---|---|---|---|---|---|
| Cannibal | Released: November 19, 2010; Labels: RCA, Kemosabe; Formats: CD, digital download, LP, streaming | 15 | 9 | 67 | 14 | 17 | 22 | US: 527,000 | RIAA: 2× Platinum; BPI: Silver; RMNZ: Gold |
| Deconstructed | Released: November 30, 2012; Labels: RCA, Kemosabe; Formats: CD, digital download, streaming | — | — | — | — | — | — | | |
| Gag Order (Live Acoustic EP from Space) | Released: June 30, 2023; Labels: RCA, Kemosabe; Formats: Digital download, streaming | — | — | — | — | — | — | | |
"—" denotes items which did not chart in that country.

== Singles ==
=== As lead artist ===
List of singles as lead artists, showing year released, selected chart positions, sales, certifications, and originating album
| Title | Year | Peak chart positions | | | | | | | | | | Sales | Certifications | Album |
| Title | Year | US | AUS | AUT | BEL (FL) | CAN | GER | IRE | NZ | SWI | UK | Sales | Certifications | Album |
|---|---|---|---|---|---|---|---|---|---|---|---|---|---|---|
| "Tik Tok" | 2009 | 1 | 1 | 1 | 4 | 1 | 1 | 3 | 1 | 1 | 4 | US: 6,800,000; WW: 14,000,000 | RIAA: 12× Platinum (Diamond); ARIA: 9× Platinum; BEA: Platinum; BPI: 3× Platinum; BVMI: 3× Platinum; IFPI AUT: Platinum; IFPI SWI: Platinum; MC: 7× Platinum; RMNZ: 6× Platinum | Animal |
| "Blah Blah Blah" (featuring 3OH!3) | 2010 | 7 | 3 | 21 | 45 | 3 | 11 | 18 | 7 | 30 | 11 | US: 2,400,000 | RIAA: 3× Platinum; ARIA: 2× Platinum; BPI: Silver; MC: 2× Platinum; RMNZ: Gold | Animal |
| "Your Love Is My Drug" | 2010 | 4 | 3 | 12 | 27 | 6 | 19 | 10 | 15 | 34 | 13 | US: 3,300,000 | RIAA: 5× Platinum; ARIA: 3× Platinum; BPI: Platinum; RMNZ: Platinum | Animal |
| "Take It Off" | 2010 | 8 | 5 | — | 22 | 8 | — | 12 | 11 | — | 15 | US: 2,500,000 | RIAA: 4× Platinum; ARIA: 3× Platinum; BPI: Gold; RMNZ: Platinum | Animal |
| "We R Who We R" | 2010 | 1 | 1 | 15 | 13 | 2 | 23 | 10 | 4 | 17 | 1 | US: 4,100,000 | RIAA: 6× Platinum; ARIA: 5× Platinum; BPI: Platinum; BVMI: Gold; RMNZ: 2× Platinum | Cannibal |
| "Blow" | 2011 | 7 | 10 | 22 | — (Note: "Blow" did not enter the Ultratop 50 Singles, but peaked at number four on the Ultratip 100.) | 12 | 39 | 28 | 8 | — | 32 | US: 3,400,000 | RIAA: 5× Platinum; ARIA: 2× Platinum; BPI: Gold; RMNZ: Platinum | Cannibal |
| "Die Young" | 2012 | 2 | 3 | 4 | 19 | 4 | 20 | 14 | 9 | 23 | 7 | US: 2,900,000 | RIAA: 6× Platinum; ARIA: 5× Platinum; BPI: 2× Platinum; BVMI: Gold; MC: Platinum; RMNZ: 3× Platinum | Warrior |
| "C'Mon" | 2012 | 27 | 19 | 64 | — (Note: "C'Mon" did not enter the Ultratop 50 Singles, but peaked at number four on the Ultratip 100.) | 16 | 79 | 33 | 22 | — | 70 | | RIAA: Platinum; ARIA: Platinum; RMNZ: Gold | Warrior |
| "Crazy Kids" (featuring will.i.am or Juicy J) | 2013 | 40 | 32 | 58 | — (Note: "Crazy Kids" did not enter the Ultratop 50 Singles, but peaked at number five on the Ultratip 100.) | 47 | 56 | 14 | — | — | 27 | | RIAA: Platinum; ARIA: Platinum | Warrior |
| "True Colors" (with Zedd) | 2016 | 74 | 76 | — | — | 66 | — | 81 | — | — | 78 | US: 52,000 | | True Colors |
| "Praying" | 2017 | 22 | 6 | 68 | — (Note: "Praying" did not enter the Ultratop 50 Singles, but peaked at number 19 on the Ultratip 100.) | 11 | — | 23 | 37 | 64 | 26 | US: 428,120 | RIAA: 5× Platinum; ARIA: 4× Platinum; BPI: Platinum; MC: 4× Platinum; RMNZ: 2× Platinum | Rainbow |
| "This Is Me" | 2017 | — | 71 | — | — | — | — | — | — | — | — (Note: "This Is Me" did not enter the UK singles chart, but peaked at number 67 on the UK Singles Sales Chart.) | | ARIA: Gold | The Greatest Showman: Reimagined |
| "Woman" (featuring the Dap-Kings Horns) | 2018 | 96 | 78 | — | — | 80 | — | — | — (Note: "Woman" did not enter the NZ Top 40 Singles Chart, but peaked at number three on the NZ Heatseekers Singles Chart.) | — | — (Note: "Woman" did not enter the UK singles chart, but peaked at number 89 on the UK Singles Sales Chart.) | | RIAA: Platinum | Rainbow |
| "Here Comes the Change" | 2018 | — | — | — | — | — | — | — | — | — | — | | | Non-album single |
| "Raising Hell" (featuring Big Freedia) | 2019 | — (Note: "Raising Hell" did not enter the Billboard Hot 100, but peaked at number 17 on the Bubbling Under Hot 100 chart.) | — | — | — | — (Note: "Raising Hell" did not enter the Canadian Hot 100, but peaked at number 35 on the Canadian Digital Song Sales chart.) | — | 97 | — (Note: "Raising Hell" did not enter the NZ Top 40 Singles Chart, but peaked at number 26 on the NZ Hot Singles Chart.) | — | — (Note: "Raising Hell" did not enter the UK singles chart, but peaked at number 66 on the UK Singles Sales Chart.) | | RIAA: Gold | High Road |
| "My Own Dance" | 2019 | — | — | — | — | — | — | — | — | — | — | | | High Road |
| "Resentment" (featuring Sturgill Simpson, Brian Wilson and Wrabel) | 2019 | — | — | — | — | — | — | — | — | — | — | | | High Road |
| "Tonight" | 2020 | — | — | — | — | — | — | — | — | — | — | | | High Road |
| "Since I Was Young" (with Wrabel) | 2020 | — | — | — | — | — | — | — | — | — | — | | | Non-album singles |
| "Drop Dead" (with Grandson and Travis Barker) (Note: The solo version of "Drop Dead" is included as an album track on Death of an Optimist, while the remix featuring Kesha and Travis Barker is not.) | 2021 | — | — | — | — | — | — | — | — | — | — | | | Non-album singles |
| "Fine Line" / "Eat the Acid" | 2023 | — | — | — | — | — | — | — | — | — | — | | | Gag Order |
| "Only Love Can Save Us Now" | 2023 | — | — | — | — | — | — | — | — | — | — | | | Gag Order |
| "Joyride" | 2024 | — (Note: "Joyride" did not enter the Billboard Hot 100, but peaked at number six on the Bubbling Under Hot 100 chart.) | — | — | — | — | — | 83 | — (Note: "Joyride" did not enter the NZ Top 40 Singles Chart, but peaked at number 17 on the NZ Hot Singles Chart.) | — | 88 | | | Period |
| "Delusional" | 2024 | — | — | — | — | — | — | — | — (Note: "Delusional" did not enter the NZ Top 40 Singles Chart, but peaked at number 27 on the NZ Hot Singles Chart.) | — | — | | | Period |
| "Dear Me" | 2025 | — | — | — | — | — | — | — | — | — | — | | | Diane Warren: Relentless |
| "Yippee-Ki-Yay" (solo or featuring T-Pain) | 2025 | — (Note: "Yippee-Ki-Yay" did not enter the Billboard Hot 100, but peaked at number 13 on the Digital Song Sales chart.) | — | — | — | — | — | — | — | — | — | | | Period |
| "Boy Crazy" | 2025 | — (Note: "Boy Crazy" did not enter the Billboard Hot 100, but peaked at number 7 on the Dance/Electronic Digital Song Sales chart.) | — | — | — | — | — | — | — (Note: "Boy Crazy" did not enter the NZ Top 40 Singles Chart, but peaked at number 38 on the NZ Hot Singles Chart.) | — | — | | | Period |
| "Attention!" (with Slayyyter and Rose Gray) | 2025 | — (Note: "Attention!" did not enter the Billboard Hot 100, but peaked at number 15 on the Dance/Electronic Digital Song Sales chart.) | — | — | — | — | — | — | — | — | — | | | Period (...) |
| "The One" | 2025 | — | — | — | — | — | — | — | — | — | — | | | Period |
| "Tennessee" (with Orville Peck featuring Tayla Parx and Hudson Mohawke) | 2025 | — | — | — | — | — | — | — | — | — | — | | | All Things Go: 10 Years |
| "Red Flag" | 2026 | — | — | — | — | — | — | — | — | — | — | | | Period |
| "Origami!" | 2026 | — | — | — | — | — | — | — | — | — | — | | | Non-album single |
"—" denotes items which did not chart in that country.

=== As featured artist ===
List of singles as featured artist, showing year released, selected chart positions, sales, certifications, and originating album
| Title | Year | Peak chart positions | | | | | | | | | | Sales | Certifications | Album |
| Title | Year | US | AUS | AUT | BEL (FL) | CAN | GER | IRE | NZ | SWI | UK | Sales | Certifications | Album |
|---|---|---|---|---|---|---|---|---|---|---|---|---|---|---|
| "Right Round" (Flo Rida featuring Kesha) (Note: Kesha was not credited as a featured artist on "Right Round" in the United States and Canada, therefore the song's performance in those countries is not attributed to her, but solely to Flo Rida.) | 2009 | — | 1 | 2 | 2 | — | 4 | 1 | 2 | 2 | 1 | US: 5,572,000; UK: 505,434; WW: 12,000,000 | BPI: 2× Platinum; BVMI: Platinum; IFPI AUT: Gold; IFPI SWI: Platinum; RMNZ: 3× Platinum | R.O.O.T.S. |
| "Dirty Picture" (Taio Cruz featuring Kesha) | 2010 | 96 | 16 | — | — | 49 | — | 10 | 11 | — | 6 | | BPI: Silver | Rokstarr |
| "My First Kiss" (3OH!3 featuring Kesha) | 2010 | 9 | 13 | 28 | — (Note: "My First Kiss" did not enter the Ultratop 50 Singles, but peaked on at number nine on the Ultratip 100.) | 7 | 37 | 10 | 15 | — | 7 | US: 1,800,000 | RIAA: Gold; BPI: Silver; MC: Platinum; RMNZ: Gold | Streets of Gold |
| "Timber" (Pitbull featuring Kesha) | 2013 | 1 | 4 | 1 | 4 | 1 | 1 | 2 | 3 | 3 | 1 | US: 4,700,000; UK: 830,000 | RIAA: 12× Platinum (Diamond); ARIA: 5× Platinum; BEA: Gold; BPI: 4× Platinum; BVMI: Diamond; IFPI AUT: Platinum; IFPI SWI: Platinum; MC: 7× Platinum; RMNZ: 6× Platinum | Meltdown |
| "Good Old Days" (Macklemore featuring Kesha) | 2017 | 48 | 8 | 24 | — (Note: "Good Old Days" did not enter the Flanders Ultratop 50, but peaked at number 36 on the Ultratip chart.) | 40 | 50 | 34 | 14 | 24 | 79 | US: 48,627 | RIAA: 3× Platinum; ARIA: 4× Platinum; BPI: Gold; MC: Platinum; RMNZ: 3× Platinum | Gemini |
| "Body Talks" (The Struts featuring Kesha) | 2018 | — | — | — | — | — | — | — | — | — | — | | | Young & Dangerous |
| "Safe" (Sage featuring Kesha and Chika) | 2018 | — | — | — | — | — | — | — | — | — | — | | | Non-album single |
| "Chasing Rainbows" (Big Freedia featuring Kesha) | 2020 | — | — | — | — | — | — | — | — | — | — | | | Louder |
| "Stronger" (Sam Feldt featuring Kesha) | 2021 | — | — | — | — | — | — | — | — (Note: "Stronger" did not enter the NZ Top 40 Singles Chart, but peaked at number 12 on the NZ Hot Singles Chart.) | — | — | | | Non-album single |
| "Fancy Like" (Walker Hayes featuring Kesha) | 2021 | — | — | — | — | — | — | — | — | — | — | | | Country Stuff |
| "Sugar Free Venom" (F5ve featuring Kesha) | 2025 | — | — | — | — | — | — | — | — | — | — | | | Sequence 01 |
| "DJ Turn It Down" (Boy Throb featuring Kesha) | 2026 | — | — | — | — | — | — | — | — | — | — | | | Non-album single |
"—" denotes items which did not chart in that country.

=== Promotional singles ===
List of promotional singles, showing year released, selected chart positions, certifications, and originating album
| Title | Year | Peak chart positions | | | | | | | | | | Certifications | Album |
| Title | Year | US | US Dance Elec. | US Hol. | US Pop Air. | ARG | CAN | IRE | NZ Hot | UK | WW | Certifications | Album |
|---|---|---|---|---|---|---|---|---|---|---|---|---|---|
| "Sleazy" | 2010 | 37 | — | — | — | — | 46 | — | — | — | — | RIAA: Gold | Cannibal |
| "Cannibal" | 2010 | 77 | — | — | — | 55 | 31 | — | — | — | — | RIAA: Platinum; ARIA: Gold; BPI: Silver; RMNZ: Gold | Cannibal |
| "Till the World Ends" (the Femme Fatale remix) (Britney Spears featuring Nicki Minaj and Kesha) | 2011 | 3 | — (Note: "Till the World Ends" did not enter the Dance/Electronic Songs chart, but peaked at number one on the Dance/Electronic Digital Song Sales chart.) | — | 4 | — | 4 | — | — | — | — | | Non-album promotional single |
| "Learn to Let Go" | 2017 | 97 | — | — | — | — | 81 | — | — | — (Note: "Learn to Let Go" did not enter the UK singles chart, but peaked at number 48 on the UK Singles Sales Chart.) | — | RIAA: Gold | Rainbow |
| "Hymn" | 2017 | — | — | — | — | — | — | — | — | — | — | | Rainbow |
| "Rich, White, Straight Men" | 2019 | — | — | — | — | — | — | — | — | — | — | | Non-album promotional single |
| "Best Day" | 2019 | — | — | — | — | — | — | — | — | — | — | | The Angry Birds Movie 2 |
| "Summer" | 2020 | — | — | — | — | — | — | — | — | — | — | | High Road |
| "Children of the Revolution" | 2020 | — | — | — | — | — | — | — | — | — | — | | AngelHeaded Hipster: The Songs of Marc Bolan and T. Rex |
| "Little Bit of Love" | 2020 | — | — | — | — | — | — | — | — | — | — | | High Road |
| "Taste So Good (The Cann Song)" (Vincint featuring Hayley Kiyoko, MNEK and Kesha) | 2022 | — | — | — | — | — | — | — | — | — | — | | Non-album promotional single |
| "Spring Breakers" (Charli XCX featuring Kesha) | 2024 | — | 20 | — | — | — | — | — | — | — | — | | Brat and It's Completely Different but Also Still Brat |
| "Holiday Road" | 2024 | 88 | 2 | 98 | — | — | 61 | 24 | 2 | 38 | 130 | | Non-album promotional singles |
| "Glow" | 2026 | — | — | — | — | — | — | — | — | — | — | | Period |
| "Backstabber" | 2026 | — | — | — | — | — | — | — | — | — | — | RIAA: Gold; BPI: Silver; RMNZ: Gold | Animal |
"—" denotes items which did not chart in that country.

== Other charted and certified songs ==
List of other charted and certified songs, showing year released, selected chart positions, certifications, and album
| Title | Year | Peak chart positions | | | | | | | | Certifications | Album |
| Title | Year | US | US Dance Pop | US Pop Dig. | CAN | KOR | NZ Heat. | NZ Hot | UK | Certifications | Album |
|---|---|---|---|---|---|---|---|---|---|---|---|
| "Kiss n Tell" | 2010 | — (Note: "Kiss n Tell" did not enter the Billboard Hot 100, but peaked at number nine on the Bubbling Under Hot 100 chart.) | — | 42 | 91 | — (Note: "Kiss n Tell" did not enter the Circle Cumulative Digital Chart, but peaked at number 74 on the Circle Foreign Digital Chart.) | — | — | 163 | RIAA: Gold | Animal |
| "Stephen" | 2010 | — | — | — | — | — (Note: "Stephen" did not enter the Circle Cumulative Digital Chart, but peaked at number 92 on the Circle Foreign Digital Chart.) | — | — | — | | Animal |
| "Hungover" | 2010 | — | — | — | — | — (Note: "Hungover" did not enter the Circle Cumulative Digital Chart, but peaked at number 106 on the Circle Foreign Digital Chart.) | — | — | — | | Animal |
| "Party at a Rich Dude's House" | 2010 | — | — | — | — | — (Note: "Party at a Rich Dude's House" did not enter the Circle Cumulative Digital Chart, but peaked at number 86 on the Circle Foreign Digital Chart.) | — | — | — | | Animal |
| "Blind" | 2010 | — | — | — | — | — (Note: "Blind" did not enter the Circle Cumulative Digital Chart, but peaked at number 109 on the Circle Foreign Digital Chart.) | — | — | — | | Animal |
| "Dinosaur" | 2010 | — | — | — | — | — (Note: "Dinosaur" did not enter the Circle Cumulative Digital Chart, but peaked at number 115 on the Circle Foreign Digital Chart.) | — | — | 180 | RIAA: Gold | Animal |
| "Dancing with Tears in My Eyes" | 2010 | — | — | — | — | — (Note: "Dancing with Tears in My Eyes" did not enter the Circle Cumulative Digital Chart, but peaked at number 96 on the Circle Foreign Digital Chart.) | — | — | — | | Animal |
| "Boots & Boys" | 2010 | — | — | — | — | — (Note: "Boots & Boys" did not enter the Circle Cumulative Digital Chart, but peaked at number 110 on the Circle Foreign Digital Chart.) | — | — | — | | Animal |
| "Animal" | 2010 | — (Note: "Animal" did not enter the Billboard Hot 100, but peaked at number 25 on the Bubbling Under Hot 100 Singles chart.) | — | — | — | — (Note: "Animal" did not enter the Circle Cumulative Digital Chart, but peaked at number 89 on the Circle Foreign Digital Chart.) | — | — | — | RIAA: Gold | Animal |
| "VIP" | 2010 | — | — | — | — | — (Note: "VIP" did not enter the Circle Cumulative Digital Chart, but peaked at number 80 on the Circle Foreign Digital Chart.) | — | — | — | | Animal |
| "C U Next Tuesday" | 2010 | — | — | — | — | 97 | — | — | — | | Animal |
| "Crazy Beautiful Life" | 2010 | 93 | — | 29 | — (Note: "Crazy Beautiful Life" did not enter the Canadian Hot 100, but peaked at number 67 on the Canadian Digital Song Sales chart.) | — | — | — | — | | Cannibal |
| "Grow a Pear" | 2010 | — (Note: "Grow a Pear" did not enter the Billboard Hot 100, but peaked at number 21 on the Bubbling Under Hot 100 Singles chart.) | — | 39 | — | — | — | — | — | RIAA: Gold | Cannibal |
| "Fuck Him He's a DJ" | 2011 | 97 | — | 37 | 75 | 191 | — | — | | | I Am the Dance Commander + I Command You to Dance: The Remix Album |
| "Warrior" | 2012 | — (Note: "Warrior" did not enter the Billboard Hot 100, but peaked at number 25 on the Bubbling Under Hot 100 Singles chart.) | — | 48 | — | — (Note: "Warrior" did not enter the Circle Cumulative Digital Chart, but peaked at number 109 on the Circle Foreign Digital Chart.) | — | — | — | | Warrior |
| "Thinking of You" | 2012 | — (Note: "Thinking of You" did not enter the Billboard Hot 100, but peaked at number 14 on the Bubbling Under Hot 100 Singles chart.) | — | 36 | — | — (Note: "Thinking of You" did not enter the Circle Cumulative Digital Chart, but peaked at number 163 on the Circle Foreign Digital Chart.) | — | — | — | | Warrior |
| "Wherever You Are" | 2012 | — | — | — | — | — (Note: "Wherever You Are" did not enter the Circle Cumulative Digital Chart, but peaked at number 164 on the Circle Foreign Digital Chart.) | — | — | — | | Warrior |
| "Dirty Love" (featuring Iggy Pop) | 2012 | — | — | — | — | — (Note: "Dirty Love" did not enter the Circle Cumulative Digital Chart, but peaked at number 177 on the Circle Foreign Digital Chart.) | — | — | — | | Warrior |
| "Wonderland" | 2012 | — | — | — | — | — (Note: "Wonderland" did not enter the Circle Cumulative Digital Chart, but peaked at number 198 on the Circle Foreign Digital Chart.) | — | — | — | | Warrior |
| "Supernatural" | 2012 | — | — | — | — | — (Note: "Supernatural" did not enter the Circle Cumulative Digital Chart, but peaked at number 181 on the Circle Foreign Digital Chart.) | — | — | — | | Warrior |
| "All That Matters (The Beautiful Life)" | 2012 | — | — | — | — | — (Note: "All That Matters (The Beautiful Life)" did not enter the Circle Cumulative Digital Chart, but peaked at number 86 on the Circle Foreign Digital Chart.) | — | — | — | | Warrior |
| "Old Flames Can't Hold a Candle to You" | 2012 | — | — | — | — | — (Note: "Old Flames Can't Hold a Candle to You" did not enter the Circle Cumulative Digital Chart, but peaked at number 15 on the Circle Foreign Digital Chart.) | — | — | — | | Deconstructed EP |
| "Rainbow" | 2017 | — (Note: "Rainbow" did not enter the Billboard Hot 100, but peaked at number 13 on the Bubbling Under Hot 100 Singles chart.) | — | — | — | — | 9 | — | — | | Rainbow |
"—" denotes items which did not chart in that country.
