= The Tits Out Tour =

2025–26 concert tour by Kesha and the Scissor Sisters

- Tour by Kesha and Scissor Sisters
- Promotional poster for the concerts
- Location: Australia; Europe; North America; South America
- Associated album: Period
- Start date: July 1, 2025
- End date: March 21, 2026
- No. of shows: 43
Kesha tour chronology
House of Kesha (2024–2025)	The Tits Out Tour (2025–2026)	The Freedom Tour (2026)
Scissor Sisters tour chronology
May 2025 UK/Ireland Arena Tour (2025)	The Tits Out Tour (2025)

The Tits Out Tour was a co-headlining concert tour by the American singer and songwriter Kesha, and the American pop rock band Scissor Sisters for the first 25 shows. The tour promoted Kesha's sixth studio album Period (2025), and was part of the Scissor Sisters reunion which began in 2024. The tour commenced on July 1, 2025, in West Valley City, Utah, and concluded on March 21 of the following year in Dublin, Ireland.

== Background and promotion ==
"Tits Out" is about a way of life—about being sick of hiding both your physical body, but also emotionally, spiritually, all your kinks, all your flaws. It’s when you just don’t have a single fuck left in you to give about what other people think about you, and you’re just ready to really express yourself in your most authentic form. I just want to create a safe space for people to come and feel like the most authentic version of themselves, and loved and celebrated for it."

— Kesha explaining the tour's name.

Following the settlement of the Kesha v. Dr. Luke, the conclusion of Kesha's Only Love Tour, and the announcement of her departure from Kemosabe and RCA Records in 2023, Kesha announced her new single "Joyride", to be the first released on her own independent record label, Kesha Records, on July 4, 2024. Her sixth studio album Period was announced on March 27, 2025, with a release date set for July 4 of the same year.

The Scissor Sisters announced their reunion in October 2024 along with a 2025 European tour. Their participation with the Tits Out Tour is described as the North American leg of their reunion tour, and their first time touring in there in over a decade. In April 2025, the dating app Feeld announced that it was the official partner of the Tits Out Tour, with Kesha creating her own Feeld profile.

The tour was announced on April 3, 2025, with ticket pre-sales started on April 8 on both Kesha and the Scissor Sisters' websites. General sales opened on April 10. The tour marks Kesha's first time performing at Madison Square Garden in New York City and the Kia Forum in Los Angeles. The tour was supported by Slayyyter and Rose Gray on selected dates. On May 9, it was announced Dutch Eurotrance group Vengaboys would be joining the stop in New York City.

European dates were announced for the spring of 2026 with only Kesha headlining. These dates marks the first time Kesha fully touring in the area since the Rainbow Tour (2017). Due to high demand, extra shows were added for Manchester and London. Following the postponement of the July 8, 2025, concert in Dallas, Texas, due to the Central Texas floods, the Scissor Sisters did not perform during the July 9 rescheduled date. Presale for Australian shows began on August 8, 2025.

== Concert synopsis ==
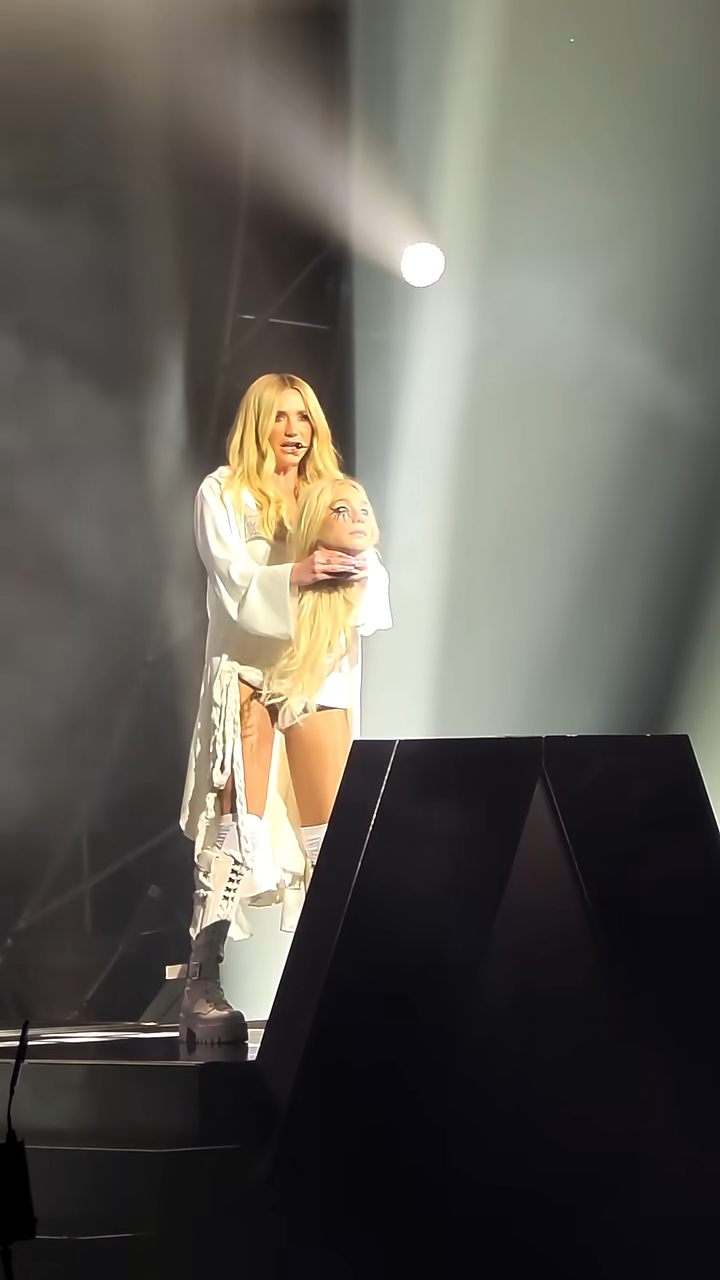
Kesha performing "Tik Tok" with the replica of her head

Kesha's set runs about 90 minutes and begins with an advertisement for the dating app, Feeld. She starts off with "Tik Tok" wearing a white bodysuit and jacket, with the opening lyrics being changed to "Wake up in the morning like fuck P. Diddy", acknowledging the abuse allegations against the rapper. During the song, she holds a replica of her head that bears resemblance to her look during the early stages of her career, before tossing it offstage, which critics interpreted the singer declaring the old Kesha "dead". She then sings a medley of songs from her second studio album, Warrior, starting with the title track. She proceeds to move through the crowd singing "C'Mon" and "Thinking of You", interacting with the fans. Songs from her earlier works were reworked with new productions.

The second act sees Kesha singing a snippet of "Sleazy" before transitioning into "Boy Crazy" with a "sexy" female fronted choreography. "Cannibal" sees her "killing" one of her dancers with a prop knife. To close the second act, she performs "Take It Off" but it is noted she asked fans to not throw their clothes on stage as they have done on previous tours.

Act three starts off with "Blow", with Kesha wearing a black latex leotard and playing an electric guitar. The song is cut short before moving onto "The Drama" and sees the singer being put in a straight jacket, the word "abuse" being flashed onto the screen behind her. Her dancers are dressed like militia and drag her around onstage while phone cameras flash her during "Fine Line". As "Ram Dass Interlude" plays, Kesha pushes the wall of phones out of her face, with Shi Bradley of Phoenix New Times praising the symbolism. Kesha ends the act with "Happy", where she sits onstage wearing a party hat and strums on the guitar. She tells the crowd: "I made this song saying one day I’ve been happy, and truth is, now I’ve never been happier in my life." The final song of act three is "Eat the Acid" and shows two robed dancers offering Kesha a crown, eventually yielding it and the gloves before exiting the stage.

Act four sees Kesha wearing a handprint top as she performs the next set of songs. Wrapping up the act, she performed "Dinosaur", where her male dancers showed up dressed as cheerleaders.

Transitioning into the final act, Kesha's name flashes onscreen in neon pink. Her final outfit consists of a more casual aesthetic with a bedazzled corset top and jeans. She belts out shortened versions of her ballads, "Cathedral" and "Praying".

Throughout her set, Kesha utilized lasers, thick smoke, bright swirling lights, which Monowara Hossain of mxdwn said made the show "fun, fierce, and deeply personal".

== Critical reception ==
Shi Bradley of Phoenix New Times gave a positive review during the Phoenix, Arizona, show. He praised the tour for giving exposure to rising and veterans of LGBTQ+ artists. Bradley also favored seeing Kesha return to her party girl image, but on the singer's own terms. "...in the light of stressful times, especially among women and the queer community, a pop party where everyone is encouraged to let loose, sing and dance their hearts out, and be the most fierce, unapologetic versions of themselves couldn’t have come any sooner."

Monowara Hossain from mxdwn favored how Kesha poured her pain in her performance at the Kia Forum in California. She opined that new songs from the singer's album, Period, hit the hardest, further stating even in their shortened form "packed an emotional punch". She noted the performance of "We R Who We R" as one of the most powerful moments of the show as the screen onstage played a montage of Kesha's childhood, early music videos, awards show highlights, and backstage moments. Hossain also gave praise to Slayyyter and the Scissor Sisters' "energetic" opening sets. Jazz Williams of music blog, Pop Passion, stated she was "in awe" at Kesha's dancing and vocal control throughout her 105-minute set. She went on praising the singer cultivating an "environment full of love, acceptance, and dance".

Adrian Horton of The Guardian rated her Madison Square Garden performance a four out of five stars. "As a statement of legacy – her Auto-tuned recklessness a clear antecedent of today’s Brat-green pop landscape – and as an act of reclamation, the Tits Out tour is a triumph." she writes. Similarly to Lady Gaga's tour, the Mayhem Ball, Horton opined that Kesha's new songs flowed seamlessly with her older ones, such as "Red Flag" blending smoothly into the cheerleader themed performance of "Dinosaur".

== Set list ==
=== Scissor Sisters ===
This set list is from the July 6, 2025, concert in Phoenix. It may not represent all concerts of the tour.

1. "Laura"
2. "She's My Man"
3. "Tits on the Radio"
4. "I Can't Decide"
5. "Any Which Way"
6. "Comfortably Numb"
7. "Let's Have a Kiki"
8. "I Don't Feel Like Dancin'"
9. "Filthy/Gorgeous"
10. "Music Is the Victim"

=== Kesha ===
This set list is from the July 5, 2025, concert in Inglewood. It may not represent all concerts of the tour.

Act One: One of One

1. "Tik Tok"
2. "Only Love Can Save Us Now"
3. "Warrior" (shortened)
4. "Crazy Kids" (shortened)
5. "C'Mon" (shortened)
6. "Thinking of You" (shortened)

Act Two: Heaven in Hell

7. "Sleazy" (shortened)
8. "Boy Crazy"
9. "Cannibal"
10. "Delusional" (shortened; featuring "Backstabber" intro)
11. "Take It Off"

Act Three: Genius or Crazy?

12. "Blow"
13. "The Drama" (shortened)
14. "Fine Line"
15. "Ram Dass Interlude"
16. "Happy"
17. "Eat the Acid"

Act Four: Freedom Cunt

18. "Freedom"
19. "Attention!" (shortened)
20. "Joyride"
21. "Yippee-Ki-Yay" (shortened)
22. "Timber"
23. "Red Flag"
24. "Dinosaur" (shortened; with "Whip It" snippet)
25. "The One"
26. "Die Young"

Act Five: Period

27. "Cathedral" (shortened)
28. "Praying" (shortened)
29. "Your Love Is My Drug"
30. "We R Who We R"

=== Notes ===
- During the July 5, 2025, concert in Inglewood, Erika Jayne performed "Let's Have a Kiki" with Scissor Sisters.

== Tour dates ==
List of 2025 concerts
Date (2025)	City	Country	Venue	Supporting acts	Attendance	Revenue
July 1	West Valley City	United States	Utah First Credit Union Amphitheatre	Slayyyter	17,620 / 17,620	$574,424
July 3	Mountain View	United States	Shoreline Amphitheatre	Slayyyter	18,313 / 18,313	$603,212
July 5	Inglewood	United States	Kia Forum	Slayyyter	7,459 / 7,459	$534,744
July 6	Phoenix	United States	Talking Stick Resort Amphitheatre	Slayyyter	11,752 / 11,752	$416,576
July 9 (Note: The July 9, 2025 concert in Dallas was originally scheduled for July 8, 2025; but was postponed, due to the floods in Central Texas.)	Dallas	United States	Dos Equis Pavilion	Slayyyter	13,750 / 13,750	$485,541
July 10	The Woodlands	United States	Cynthia Woods Mitchell Pavilion	Slayyyter	13,347 / 13,347	$549,437
July 12	Tinley Park	United States	Credit Union 1 Amphitheatre	Slayyyter	21,674 / 21,674	$693,356
July 13	Maryland Heights (Note: Labelled as St. Louis in promotional material.)	United States	Hollywood Casino Amphitheatre	Slayyyter	17,996 / 17,996	$593,677
July 15	Nashville	United States	Ascend Amphitheater	Slayyyter	6,516 / 6,516	$337,141
July 16	Cincinnati	United States	Riverbend Music Center	Slayyyter	16,780 / 16,780	$517,717
July 18	Noblesville	United States	Ruoff Music Center	Slayyyter	22,410 / 22,410	$700,186
July 19	Clarkston	United States	Pine Knob Music Theatre	Rose Gray	14,535 / 14,535	$614,956
July 21	Toronto	Canada	Budweiser Stage	Rose Gray	15,828 / 15,828	$768,185
July 23	New York City	United States	Madison Square Garden	Vengaboys	12,362 / 12,362	$1,066,459
July 24	Mansfield	United States	Xfinity Center	Rose Gray	19,368 / 19,368	$677,732
July 26	Burgettstown	United States	The Pavilion at Star Lake	Rose Gray	17,052 / 17,052	$484,271
July 28	Cuyahoga Falls	United States	Blossom Music Center	Rose Gray	19,930 / 19,930	$582,294
July 29	Philadelphia	United States	TD Pavilion at the Mann	Rose Gray	11,921 / 11,921	$620,902
July 31	Corfu (Note: Labelled as Buffalo in promotional material.)	United States	Darien Lake Performing Arts Center	Rose Gray	21,453 / 21,453	$606,090
August 2	Virginia Beach	United States	Veterans United Home Loans Amphitheater	Rose Gray	19,175 / 19,175	$561,895
August 3	Raleigh	United States	Coastal Credit Union Music Park	Rose Gray	17,739 / 17,739	$504,443
August 5	Charlotte	United States	PNC Music Pavilion	Rose Gray	14,920 / 14,920	$480,281
August 7	Alpharetta	United States	Ameris Bank Amphitheatre	Rose Gray	11,809 / 11,809	$440,108
August 9	West Palm Beach	United States	iTHINK Financial Amphitheatre	Rose Gray	12,973 / 12,973	$441,826
August 10	East Lake-Orient Park (Note: Labelled as Tampa in promotional material.)	United States	MidFlorida Credit Union Amphitheatre	Rose Gray	14,935 / 14,935	$541,946
September 28 (Note: The September 28, 2025 concert in Columbia was a part of All Things Go Music Festival.)	Columbia	United States	Merriweather Post Pavilion	—N/a		

List of 2026 concerts
Date (2026)	City	Country	Venue	Supporting acts	Attendance	Revenue
January 24 (Note: The January 24, 2026 concert in São Paulo show was a part of the CarnaUOL Festival.)	São Paulo	Brazil	Allianz Parque	—N/a	—	—
February 19	Brisbane	Australia	Riverstage	Blusher	—	—
February 21 (Note: The February 21, 2026 concert in Sydney was a part of the Mighty Hoopla Sydney festival.)	Sydney	Australia	Bondi Beach	—N/a	—	—
February 22	Melbourne	Australia	John Cain Arena (Note: The February 22, 2026 concert in Melbourne was originally scheduled to take place at the Margaret Court Arena.)	Blusher	—	—
February 24	Adelaide	Australia	AEC Arena	Blusher	—	—
February 26	Perth	Australia	Perth High Performance Centre	Blusher	—	—
February 28 (Note: The February 28, 2026 concert in Christchurch was a part of the Electric Avenue Festival.)	Christchurch	New Zealand	North Hagley Park	—N/a	—	—
March 6	Paris	France	Zénith Paris	Sizzy Rocket	–	—
March 7	Amsterdam	Netherlands	AFAS Live	Sizzy Rocket	—	—
March 9	Antwerp	Belgium	Lotto Arena	Sizzy Rocket	—	—
March 11	Glasgow	Scotland	OVO Hydro	Sizzy Rocket	—	—
March 13	Manchester	England	Aviva Studios	Sizzy Rocket	—	—
March 14	Manchester	England	Aviva Studios	Sizzy Rocket	—	—
March 16	London	England	O_{2} Academy Brixton	Sizzy Rocket	—	—
March 17	London	England	O_{2} Academy Brixton	Sizzy Rocket	—	—
March 19	Wolverhampton	England	Wolverhampton Civic Hall	Sizzy Rocket	—	—
March 21	Dublin	Ireland	3Arena	Sizzy Rocket	—	—

== Cancelled shows ==
List of cancelled concerts, showing date, city, country, venue and reason for cancellation
Date	City	Country	Venue	Reason
March 4	Berlin	Germany	Uber Eats Music Hall	Flight cancellation

=== Notes ===
Cities

Others
