= The Freedom Tour (Kesha) =

2026 concert tour by Kesha

- Tour by Kesha
- Promotional poster for the tour
- Location: Asia; Europe; North America
- Associated album: Period
- Start date: May 23, 2026
- End date: October 6, 2026
- No. of shows: 30
Kesha tour chronology
The Tits Out Tour (2025–2026)	The Freedom Tour (2026)

The Freedom Tour was the eighth headlining concert tour by American singer-songwriter Kesha to promote her sixth studio album Period (2025). Chromeo, Meek, Erika Jayne and Sizzy Rocket served as supporting acts. The tour began on May 23, 2026 in Chula Vista, California, and concluded on October 6, 2026 in Taizhou, Jiangsu.

== Background ==
The Freedom Tour was announced just days after Kesha had ended her Tits Out Tour in the UK, with ticket presale beginning on March 24, 2026. In a statement, Kesha expressed her desire to share her feelings of freedom: "I’ve lived through the fire. This tour is about what comes after. Freedom isn’t just leaving something behind — it’s discovering that what you have lived through has made you magnificently who you are." The tour saw Kesha performing at several festivals, including Bonnaroo, All Things Go Toronto Music Festival, and BST Hyde Park, in support of rapper, Pitbull.

== Concert synopsis ==
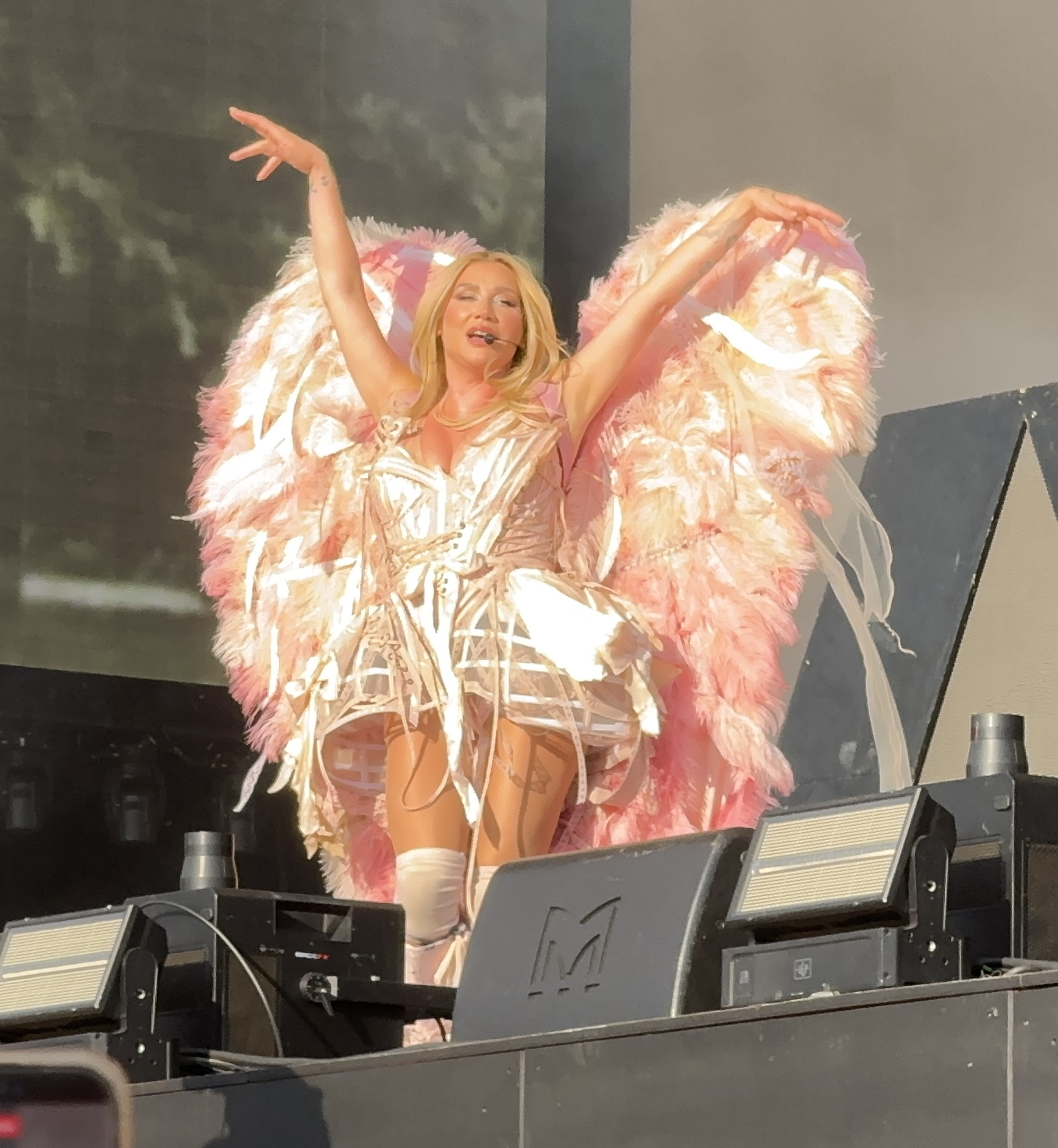
Kesha performing at BST Hyde Park

The show followed a similar concept and setlist as the Tits Out Tour. The set lasted 90 minutes and is divided into three acts. A large circular screen stood behind Kesha that displayed the visuals and she was primarily joined by six backup dancers. It began with Kesha rising from the stage wearing bedazzled angel wings to perform "Tik Tok". The singer loudly declares her stance against abuse, with the opening lyric being changed to "Wake up in the morning like fuck P. Diddy". A dramatic performance of "Only Love Can Save Us Now" containing "cathedral-style lighting" followed, which then went into a medley of songs from Warrior. She notes she has not sung songs from this album in over a decade and asks the crowd to help reclaim them. During the medley, Kesha walked through the audience while riding on the shoulders of her dancers.

The second act opened up with a slowed down, moodier take of "Blow", with Kesha playing the guitar.

The third act leaned into "glossy dance-pop theatrics" with songs "Attention!" and "Origami!", which critics found it focusing on Kesha's newfound independence. During "Joyride", the screen behind the singer would flash bright lights with the lyrics to the song, while for "Attention!", the title would display in different brand-like fonts like 7-Eleven and Budweiser. Her acoustic set would rotate different songs she has not performed in years such as "Past Lives" and "C U Next Tuesday". She would then sing "Good Old Days", her 2017 single with Macklemore and reminisce about the making of the song, even joking about the rapper denting her car.

For the encore, Kesha wore an elaborate gold halo for the ballads, "Cathedral" and "Praying". The show then closed with "Your Love Is My Drug" and "We R Who We R".

== Critical reception ==
In his review of the show in Dallas, Texas, Alex Gonzalez of Dallas Observer opined that Kesha's star power has not faded, despite being nearly 20 years into her career. He added, "...it's clear she’s still unlocking new levels to her prowess as a performer." Jared Fessler, who reviewed the Shakopee, Minnesota show, praised the production, stating the colorful lights and screens added to the performance without taking attention away from the music. "The atmosphere was upbeat from beginning to end, and the audience stayed engaged throughout the entire concert," Fessler wrote for Broadway World.

== Set list ==
This set list is from the May 23, 2026, concert in Chula Vista. It may not represent all concerts of the tour.

1. "Tik Tok"
2. "Only Love Can Save Us Now"
3. "Warrior" (shortened)
4. "Crazy Kids" (shortened)
5. "C'Mon" (shortened)
6. "Thinking of You" (shortened)
7. "Out Alive" (interlude)
8. "Blow"
9. "Sleazy" (shortened)
10. "Boy Crazy"
11. "Cannibal"
12. "Delusional" (shortened; featuring "Backstabber" intro)
13. "Take It Off"
14. "The Drama" / "Freedom" / "Ram Dass Interlude" (shortened, interlude)
15. "Attention!" (shortened)
16. "Joyride"
17. "Origami!"
18. "Yippee-Ki-Yay" (shortened)
19. "Timber"
20. "Red Flag"
21. "Dinosaur" (shortened; with "Whip It" snippet)
22. "Past Lives" (acoustic)
23. "Good Old Days" (acoustic)
24. "Die Young"
25. "The One" (interlude)
26. "Cathedral" (shortened)
27. "Praying" (shortened)
28. "Your Love Is My Drug"
29. "We R Who We R"

Notes

- "Red Flag", "Dinosaur", and "Past Lives" were not performed on select dates.
- "C U Next Tuesday" was performed on select dates over "Past Lives".
- Kesha performed "Old Flames Can't Hold a Candle to You" in honor of Dolly Parton at the August 25 show in Pittsburgh.

== Tour dates ==
List of concerts, showing date, city, country and venue
Date (2026)	City	Country	Venue	Supporting act(s)	Attendance	Revenue
May 23	Chula Vista	United States	North Island Credit Union Amphitheatre	Chromeo; Sizzy Rocket	—	—
May 24	Inglewood (Note: Labelled as Los Angeles in promotional material.)	United States	Kia Forum	Chromeo; Sizzy Rocket	—	—
May 27	Concord	United States	Toyota Pavilion at Concord	Chromeo; Sizzy Rocket	—	—
May 30	West Valley City	United States	Utah First Credit Union Amphitheatre	Chromeo; Sizzy Rocket	—	—
June 1	Morrison	United States	Red Rocks Amphitheatre	Chromeo; Sizzy Rocket	—	—
June 3	Riverside (Note: Labelled as Kansas City in promotional material.)	United States	Morton Amphitheater	Chromeo; Sizzy Rocket	—	—
June 5	Clarkston	United States	Pine Knob Music Theatre	Chromeo; Sizzy Rocket	—	—
June 6 (Note: The June 6, 2026 concert in Toronto is a part of the All Things Go Toronto Music Festival.)	Toronto	Canada	RBC Amphitheatre	—N/a	—	—
June 8	Wantagh	United States	Northwell at Jones Beach Theater	Chromeo; Sizzy Rocket	—	—
June 10	Raleigh	United States	Coastal Credit Union Music Park	Chromeo; Sizzy Rocket	—	—
June 14 (Note: The June 14, 2026 concert in Manchester is a part of the Bonnaroo music festival.)	Manchester	United States	Great Stage Park	—N/a	—N/a	—N/a
July 7 (Note: The July 7, 2026 concert in Cork is a part of the Live at the Marquee concert series.)	Cork	Ireland	Docklands	—N/a	—N/a	—N/a
July 10 (Note: The July 10, 2026 concert in London is a part of the BST Hyde Park festival in support of Pitbull.)	London	England	Hyde Park	—N/a	—N/a	—N/a
July 15 (Note: The July 15, 2026 concert in Quebec City is a part of Festival d'été de Québec.)	Quebec City (Note: Labelled as Quebec in promotional material.)	Canada	Plains of Abraham	—N/a	—N/a	—N/a
July 17	St. John's	Canada	Churchill Park	—N/a	—N/a	—N/a
August 3	Shakopee	United States	Mystic Lake Amphitheater	Chromeo; Meek	—	—
August 5	Rogers	United States	Walmart Arkansas Music Pavilion	Chromeo; Meek	—	—
August 7	Dallas	United States	Dos Equis Pavilion	Chromeo; Meek	—	—
August 9	Austin	United States	Germania Insurance Amphitheater	Chromeo; Meek	—	—
August 12	Charlotte	United States	Truliant Amphitheater	Chromeo; Meek	—	—
August 14	Gainesville (Note: Labelled as Bristow in promotional material.)	United States	Jiffy Lube Live	Chromeo; Meek	—	—
August 15	Hershey	United States	Hersheypark Stadium	Chromeo; Meek	—	—
August 18	Saratoga Springs	United States	Saratoga Performing Arts Center	Chromeo; Erika Jayne	—	—
August 19	Holmdel	United States	PNC Bank Arts Center	Chromeo; Erika Jayne	—	—
August 21	Mansfield	United States	Xfinity Center	Chromeo; Erika Jayne	—	—
August 22	Uncasville	United States	Mohegan Sun Arena	Erika Jayne	—	—
August 25	Burgettstown	United States	The Pavilion at Star Lake	Chromeo; Erika Jayne	—	—
August 26	Grand Rapids	United States	Acrisure Amphitheater	Chromeo; Erika Jayne	—	—
August 29	Tinley Park	United States	Credit Union 1 Amphitheatre	Chromeo; Erika Jayne	—	—
August 30	Noblesville	United States	Ruoff Music Center	Chromeo; Erika Jayne	—	—
October 6 (Note: The October 6, 2026 show in Taizhou was part of the AHA Music Festival.)	Taizhou	China	Taizhou Sports Center	—	—	—

== Cancelled shows ==
List of cancelled concerts, showing date, city, country, venue and reason for cancellation
Date	City	Country	Venue	Reason
May 29	Paradise (Note: Labelled as Las Vegas in promotional material.)	United States	MGM Grand Garden Arena	Unknown
July 3 (Note: The July 3, 2026 concert in Leeds is a part of the Roundhay Park Festival in support of Pitbull.)	Leeds	England	Roundhay Park	Scheduling conflict
July 5 (Note: The July 5, 2026 concert in Margate is a part of the Dreamland Festival.)	Margate	England	Dreamland Margate	Scheduling conflict
July 18 (Note: The July 18, 2026 concert in Edmonton is a part of the Neon Skies Festival.)	Edmonton	Canada	Fan Park	Severe weather

== Notes ==
Cities

Others
