= The One (Kesha song) =

2025 single by Kesha

Single by Kesha

from the album Period
- Released: June 27, 2025
- Genre: Pop
- Length: 3:25
- Label: Kesha
- Songwriters: Kesha Sebert; Zhone
- Producers: Zhone; Kesha

Kesha singles chronology
"Attention" (2025)	"The One" (2025)	"Tennessee" (2025)

"The One" (stylized as "THE ONE.") is a song by American singer and songwriter Kesha. It was released on June 27, 2025, by her own self-titled record label as the fifth single from her sixth studio album, Period (2025). The single was written and produced by Kesha, with additional writing and production credit to Zhone. The song debuted and peaked at number 1 on the iTunes Top Songs chart.

== Background and release ==
The title of "The One", like all of the other singles, was first teased after it was shown to be one of the character names in the "Joyride" music video.

== Composition ==
"The One" is a "massive, shiny pop song" where Kesha sings about "overcoming relentless heartbreaks only to truly find herself" and "[Kesha] reflecting on her stardom and success, saying she’s found “the love” and declaring herself as The One".

== Critical reception ==
Mary Chiney of Beats Per Minute considered "The One" a standout track on Kesha's Period, "featuring all the essential elements of a solid pop song." Conversely, Slant Magazine's Paul Attard found it "over-produced", sounding "like something Katy Perry might have released a decade ago", and added that it's missing "that spark or X-factor" that would make it fun.

== Track listing ==
"The One" – EP

1. "The One" – 3:24
2. "Boy Crazy" – 2:28
3. "Yippee-Ki-Yay" – 2:37
4. "Delusional" – 3:34
5. "Joyride" – 2:30

== Release history ==
"The One" release history
Region	Date	Format(s)	Edition	Label	Ref.
Various	June 27, 2025	Digital download; streaming	Single	Kesha	
Various	June 27, 2025	Streaming	Spotify EP	Kesha	
