= Period (album) =

2025 album by Kesha

.
- Standard cover

Studio album by Kesha
- Released: July 4, 2025
- Genre: Pop
- Length: 38:29
- Label: Kesha
- Producers: Stuart Crichton; Drew Erickson; Heavy Mellow; Kesha; Max Margolis; Hudson Mohawke; Nova Wav; Pink Slip; Rissi; Jonathan Wilson; Xander; Zhone

Kesha chronology
Gag Order (Live Acoustic EP from Space) (2023)	. (2025)

Singles from .
- 1. "Joyride" Released: July 4, 2024; 2. "Delusional" Released: November 29, 2024; 3. "Yippee-Ki-Yay" Released: March 27, 2025; 4. "Boy Crazy" Released: May 16, 2025; 5. "The One" Released: June 27, 2025; 6. "Red Flag" Released: February 3, 2026

Singles from . (...)
- 1. "Attention" Released: June 20, 2025

. (pronounced Period) is the sixth studio album by American singer and songwriter Kesha. It was released on July 4, 2025, through her eponymous independent label, Kesha Records. It marks her first project since departing from RCA and Kemosabe Records in December 2023. She primarily collaborated with producer and songwriter Zhone, who worked on five of the album's tracks. Stuart Crichton, Stint and Hudson Mohawke also served as producers, as well as new collaborators Rissi, Pink Slip, Nova Wav, Jonathan Wilson and Drew Erickson, with songwriting contributions from Skyler Stonestreet, Madison Love, Royal & the Serpent, and Kesha's mother Pebe Sebert.

Musically, Period sees a return to Kesha's pop roots, with elements of other genres such as polka, EDM, country pop, soul, hip-hop, Europop, house, electro, hyperpop, and disco. A deluxe edition of the album, subtitled ..., was released on July 8, 2025, adding guest appearances from T-Pain, Slayyyter, Rose Gray, and Jade, as well as remixes from A. G. Cook and Only Fire.

Critically, the album received generally positive reviews from music critics, who felt the album was a fresh start for Kesha, although opinions on some of the tracks saw them sounding dated. The album was supported by the release of six singles: "Joyride", "Delusional", "Yippee-Ki-Yay", "Boy Crazy", "The One", and "Red Flag". To further promote the album, Kesha embarked on the Tits Out Tour with Scissor Sisters, from July 2025 to March 2026, and on the Freedom Tour, from May to August 2026.

== Background ==
From 2014 to 2023, Kesha had been embroiled in a legal battle with her former producer, Dr. Luke. She had originally sued him for sexual assault and battery, which he countersued for defamation. Kesha had filed a preliminary injunction in 2016 to be released from her contract with RCA Records and Kemosabe Records which she signed when she was 18. She was denied the injunction, and has since released three more albums under the labels. Her fifth and final album under the contract, Gag Order, was released by RCA and Kemosabe in May 2023. Her lawsuit was set to go to trial in July 2023, but a settlement was reached a month before the trial date, thus ending the near decade long suit.

While on Monica Lewinsky's podcast, Kesha stated that her record label informed her she would be dropped in three months, after Gag Order underperformed on the charts as compared to her other albums. In December 2023, Variety reported that Kesha had parted ways with both labels and her management team. She said in a statement: "In need of a fresh start in my life, we have parted ways, but I will remain forever grateful for the run we had". She signed with a new management team, Crush Music, in February 2024. In an interview with V Magazine, Kesha had hinted about new music; she was officially allowed to release new music independently in March 2024.

In September 2024, Kesha's independent record label, Kesha Records, entered a distribution deal with Alternative Distribution Alliance, owned by Warner Music Group. In an interview with Paper, she said her upcoming album is the first album she felt "free" both creatively and legally, stating that she is "embody[ing] freedom in every way possible". She stated her goal for this album was to "create a safe space for people to feel fully embodied and liberated. That's what this album stands for, that's what [she's] going through personally." While accepting the Visionary Award at the Center annual dinner, Kesha said "[she] wanted to walk into this album cycle being a completely empowered, fully healed, and unbothered cunt".

In a July 2025 interview with Billboard, Kesha described the album as her second chance and a way of reclaiming her joy, stating: "I waited for this moment my entire goddamn life". She further detailed that compiling the album's track list was one of the hardest parts of the album's process. The deluxe version of the album features guest appearances from T-Pain, Slayyyter, Rose Gray, and Jade.

== Composition ==
Musically, the album is described as a pop record, with influences from several other genres such as disco, Europop, country pop and house. The album contains a total of 11 tracks on the standard edition. "Freedom", the opening track that runs about six minutes, is described as a "wistful meditation" that transitions into an 80s jazzy house dance and disco track. The song finds Kesha singing about embracing freedom. The lead single, "Joyride" is a blend of electropop, dance-pop, synth-pop, EDM and polka. The song has hyperpop influences utilizing accordions, heavy synths, and modulated vocals.

The third track, "Yippee-Ki-Yay", is a twangy hip-hop and country-pop number that drew comparisons to Shaboozey's "A Bar Song (Tipsy)". The song fuses acoustic guitar, percussion and clap snares as Kesha belts out a chorus about spending time with friends around a bonfire and buying a new car. "Delusional" is an "emotionally charged" pop power ballad, showcasing Kesha's vulnerability. Lyrically, the song sees the singer confronting an ex who seems unable to face up to reality. The Europop track "Red Flag" sees Kesha welcoming chaos and complications over boredom while she sings over a pulsating synth-pop beat and hand-clapping. "Love Forever" is described as a mid-tempo retro disco composition utilizing vocoders. The fifth single, "The One", incorporates horns that drew comparisons to Panic! at the Disco's single "High Hopes". Lyrically, the song is about overcoming relentless heartbreaks only to truly find oneself sees the singer reflecting on her stardom and success. Mary Chiney of Beats Per Minute saw this track as a standout from the album, praising the "essential elements of a solid pop song".

The fourth single, "Boy Crazy", is a "high energy" hyperpop and Europop anthem that sees Kesha singing from the perspective of a "horny and wild-hearted femme fatale". The electro number "Glow", sees glitchy, auto-tuned vocals from Kesha over an 8-bit synth. The sultry, mid-tempo house, soul, and electro blended track "Too Hard" is described as a "euphoric" love song. The closing track, "Cathedral", is a piano ballad that centers around self-love and treating her own body like a temple. Kristin S. Hé of NME called it the "spiritual sequel" to Kesha's 2017 single "Praying". Off of the deluxe edition ..., the single "Attention" is a house-influenced track that features Slayyyter and Rose Gray.

== Release and promotion ==
On March 6, 2024, a video titled "Kesha is waiting for you" was posted to Kesha's YouTube channel which contained a snippet of a new song, which would later be revealed to be the opening track "Freedom". In 2024, Kesha held her first TED Talk, speaking about songwriting and how it impacted her life. There, she debuted the closing track of the then-unannounced album, "Cathedral".

On March 19, 2025, all of Kesha's album covers were changed to have a large pink circle covering them on streaming platforms. Alongside the release of the third single "Yippee-Ki-Yay" on March 27, the album's title, cover art, and track listing were released. Hashflags were made to promote the album on X by tweeting #Kesha, #KeshaSummer, #letsparty, and #KeshaFreedom. Each hashtag was accompanied by the pink circle. The album was available in seven colored vinyl variants. To promote the album, Kesha embarked on the Tits Out Tour, along with pop-rock band Scissor Sisters, on July 1, 2025. Slayyyter, Vengaboys, Rose Gray serve as the opening acts.

=== Singles ===
The lead single, "Joyride", was released on July 4, 2024, marking her first release after parting ways with Kemosabe and RCA Records. It became her first song to chart on the UK Singles Chart since 2017, while also reaching the top-ten on three component charts in the United States, and has accumulated over 100 million streams on Spotify. A music video was released on November 20, drawing inspiration from the Kill Bill film series. On November 29, she released the second single from the album, "Delusional". The use of generative artificial intelligence for the single's artwork was criticized; however, the artwork was updated in 2025.

On March 24, 2025, Kesha announced the third single, "Yippee-Ki-Yay" featuring T-Pain. Described as a country pop track, it was released on March 27, with the pre-order of the album. "Boy Crazy" was released as the fourth single on May 16. A music video was released on June 17, which contained a reference to the Last Supper. On June 20, Kesha released a collaborative single with Slayyyter and Rose Gray, "Attention". While not present on the standard edition of Period, the track was later included on its deluxe edition. "The One" was announced to be released as the fifth single on June 27. "Red Flag" was released as the sixth single on February 3, 2026. The official music video was filmed on the red carpet at the 68th Grammy Awards.

=== Other songs ===
"Glow", remixed by Australian pop group Blusher, was released on January 15, 2026, as a promotional single.

== Critical reception ==
Professional ratings
Aggregate scores
Source	Rating
AnyDecentMusic?	6.3/10
Metacritic	71/100
Review scores
Source	Rating
AllMusic	4.5/5 stars
The Arts Desk	3/5 stars
Beats Per Minute	62%
The Guardian	4/5 stars
MusicOMH	3.5/5 stars
NME	3/5 stars
Paste	5/10
Pitchfork	5.1/10
Rolling Stone	4/5 stars
Slant Magazine	2.5/5 stars

According to the review aggregator Metacritic, Period received "generally favorable reviews" based on a weighted average score of 71 out of 100 from 12 critic scores. Prior to the album's release, Maura Johnston of Rolling Stone gave the album a four out of five stars. Kristin S. Hé of NME called the album her "sleekest" one yet since her 2010 extended play, Cannibal. The Guardian's Alexis Petridis saw the album as a "fresh start" for Kesha after her lengthy legal battle and opined all the songs are "really strong, filled with smart little twists and drops, and funny, self-referential lines". Matt Collar of AllMusic opined that the album is a "bold declaration" that's been in the making for the singer, whose had a "rough decade". He stated the album was fun and "effervescently" inspired. Mary Chiney of Beats Per Minute praised Kesha's vocal range but felt some of the songs such as "Glow" and "Cathedral" made the album feel uncohesive.

In a more mixed review, Paul Attard of Slant Magazine felt Kesha seemed "torn" between recreating the spark of her early work or continuing in a more introspective, experimental direction like her previous record, Gag Order (2023), and found some of the tracks "distracting". Paste magazine's Sam Rosenberg criticized many of the tracks, calling them "lazy, obnoxious, and dated".

== Commercial performance ==
Period debuted at number 17 on the US Billboard 200, number one on the Top Album Sales and Top Dance Albums charts, and number three on the Independent Albums charts. It has sold 23,000 equivalent album units with 15,500 from traditional album sales and 11,000 from vinyl purchases.

== Track listing ==
Credits were adapted from the album's liner notes.

Standard edition
No.	Title	Writer(s)	Producer(s)	Length
1.	"Freedom"	Kesha Sebert; Jonathan Wilson; Drew Erickson	Wilson; Erickson	6:24
2.	"Joyride"	K. Sebert; Madison Love; Zhone	Kesha; Zhone	2:30
3.	"Yippee-Ki-Yay"	K. Sebert; Kyle Buckley; Brittany "Chi" Coney; Denisia "Blu June" Andrews; Ryan Jillian Santiago; Poutyface	Pink Slip; Nova Wav	2:38
4.	"Delusional"	K. Sebert; Love; Zhone	Kesha; Zhone	3:34
5.	"Red Flag"	K. Sebert; Skyler Stonestreet; Caroline Pennell; Heavy Mellow; Stint	Kesha; Zhone; Stint^{[c]}	3:35
6.	"Love Forever"	K. Sebert; Pebe Sebert; Stuart Crichton	Crichton	3:44
7.	"The One"	K. Sebert; Zhone	Zhone; Kesha	3:25
8.	"Boy Crazy"	K. Sebert; Love; Zhone	Zhone; Kesha	2:29
9.	"Glow"	K. Sebert; Hudson Mohawke	Mohawke	3:32
10.	"Too Hard"	K. Sebert; P. Sebert; Crichton	Crichton; Max Margolis	2:42
11.	"Cathedral"	K. Sebert; Stonestreet; Morten Ristorp; Alex Papamitrou	Rissi; Xander	3:56
Total length:				38:29

Deluxe edition
No.	Title	Writer(s)	Producer(s)	Length
12.	"Trashman"	K. Sebert; Mohawke; Stonestreet; Heavy Mellow	Kesha; Mohawke; Mellow	2:39
13.	"Boy Crazy" (featuring Jade)	K. Sebert; Love; Zhone; Jade Thirlwall	Zhone; Kesha	2:50
14.	"Attention" (with Slayyyter and Rose Gray)	K. Sebert; Leah Kate; Gray; Love; Buckley; Slayyyter	Pink Slip	3:28
15.	"Yippee-Ki-Yay" (featuring T-Pain)	K. Sebert; Buckley; Coney; Andrews; Santiago; Poutyface; Faheem Najm	Pink Slip; Nova Wav	3:32
16.	"Delusional" (edit)	K. Sebert; Love; Zhone	Kesha; Zhone	3:15
17.	"Yippee-Ki-Yay" (A. G. Cook remix; featuring T-Pain)	K. Sebert; Buckley; Coney; Andrews; Santiago; Poutyface; Najm	Pink Slip; Nova Wav	3:51
18.	"Yippee-Ki-Yay" (Hosed Down remix)	K. Sebert; Buckley; Coney; Andrews; Santiago; Poutyface	Pink Slip; Nova Wav; Daniel Rios	1:59
19.	"Joyride" (Revved Up remix)	K. Sebert; Love; Zhone	Zhone; Kesha	2:04
20.	"Boy Crazy" (Only Fire smash remix)	K. Sebert; Love; Zhone	Zhone; Kesha	3:02

=== Notes ===
- ^{^[c]} indicates a co-producer.
- All track titles are stylized in all caps and with a period at the end, except for "Attention" which has an exclamation point at the end.
- On Spotify, an altered version of the standard album is available, with the single edit of "Yippee-Ki-Yay" featuring T-Pain listed as the third track.

== Personnel ==
Credits were adapted from the album's liner notes.

- Kesha Sebert – lead vocals (all tracks); background vocals, vocoder (tracks 6, 10)
- Randy Merrill – mastering
- Jonathan Wilson – mixing, bass, drum programming, percussion, background vocals (1)
- Josh T. Pearson – background vocals (1)
- Drew Erickson – synthesizers, piano, air horn (1)
- Michael Harris – engineering (1)
- Tom Norris – mixing (2, 3, 5–11)
- Zhone – keyboard, programming (2, 4, 5, 7, 8); background vocals (2, 5, 7, 8), bass (4)
- Matt Wolach – mixing (4)
- Stuart Crichton – keyboards, bass, guitar, background vocals, vocoder (6, 10); beats (10)
- Hudson Mohawke – programming, engineering (9)
- Max Margolis – keyboards, bass, guitar, beats (10)
- Rissi – piano (11)
- Matt Siskin – creative direction
- Brendan Walter – creative direction, album photography

== Charts ==
Chart performance for Period
Chart (2025)	Peak position
Belgian Albums (Ultratop Flanders)	155
Belgian Albums (Ultratop Wallonia)	50
Canadian Albums (Billboard)	76
French Albums (SNEP)	181
German Albums (Offizielle Top 100)	84
Irish Albums (IRMA)	88
Polish Albums (ZPAV)	61
Scottish Albums (Official Charts)	2
Spanish Vinyl Albums (Promusicae)	61
UK Albums (Official Charts)	43
UK Independent Albums (Official Charts)	3
US Billboard 200	17
US Independent Albums (Billboard)	3
US Top Dance Albums (Billboard)	1

== Release history ==
List of release dates and formats
Region	Date	Formats	Version	Label	Ref.
Various	July 4, 2025	CD; digital download; streaming; vinyl	Standard	Kesha	
Various	July 8, 2025	Digital download; streaming	Deluxe	Kesha	
