= Anna Malygon =

Ukrainian influencer (born 2003)

- Анна Малигон
- Driver's license portrait, 2026
- Pronunciation: Anna Malyhon
- Born: June 5, 2003 (age 23); Kharkiv, Ukraine
- Education: Humber Polytechnic
- Occupations: Influencer, model
- Years active: 2021–present

Instagram information
- Page: Anna Malygon
- Years active: 2016–present
- Genres: Lip-syncing, dancing, vlogging, skits
- Followers: 2.6 million

TikTok information
- Page: anna malygon
- Years active: 2021–present
- Genres: Lip-syncing, dancing, vlogging, skits
- Followers: 7.7 million

X information
- Handle: @malygonnn
- Display name: Anna Malygon
- Years active: 2023–present
- Topic: Entertainment
- Followers: 218 thousand

YouTube information
- Channel: Maligoshik 🎀
- Years active: 2024–present
- Genres: Lip-syncing, dancing, vlogging, skits
- Subscribers: 114 thousand
- Views: 114 million
- Last updated: October 13, 2026
- Website: maligoshik.com

Anna Malygon (Note: Ukrainian: Анна Малигон, romanized: Anna Malyhon) (born June 5, 2003) is a Ukrainian influencer and model based in the United States. Born in Ukraine, Malygon emigrated to North America in the early 2020s and formalized her stay in the US after Russia's 2022 invasion of Ukraine. She garnered attention around this time primarily from her videos on TikTok and Instagram, which among other things, showcase her living in a "castle" with a butler. She is also known as an OnlyFans creator and fashion model, as well as being an advocate for her country amidst its war with Russia.

== Biography ==
Anna Malygon was born on June 5, 2003, in Kharkiv, Ukraine. In an interview with Numéro Netherlands, Malygon stated that she grew up in a middle-class family. She attended the local Boyka Author's School, a private institution. Growing up, she aspired to be a teacher or a runway model, and has stated that she wanted to move to the US as early as age 10. In 2021, she moved to Canada to study film and media production at Humber Polytechnic in Toronto; she studied at that institution until 2024. Following the escalation of the Russo-Ukrainian war in 2022, she moved to the United States, settling in Los Angeles in June, where until August, she worked as a production assistant for YouTuber Chase Behrend.

Around the time she came to America, she became a professional influencer, garnering large followings on multiple platforms. She garnered initial prominence on social media from lip-syncing videos, clickbait skits, dances, and content relating to traveling and university. One video on TikTok that garnered particular virality in 2023 was a video in which Malygon's boyfriend left their car to supposedly talk to his mother, only for the car's dashboard, which was still linked to his phone via Bluetooth, to show that he was talking to a different woman. Another one in 2026 saw her "rent a dad" in Japan. Malygon has stated that she treated social media as a full-time job from the start. When starting out on social media, Malygon noticed that the most controversial posts got the most attention, so she adopted a strategy of intentionally ragebaiting, later stating that she "gained all [her] views on hate and controversy."

A running theme on her social media is of her living in a castle-like mansion with a butler. The "castle" was to be a temporary home while her actual house was being built, and since she liked castles, she thought of it to be the perfect temporary home. The butler, who she calls Alfred in her posts, is actually named Jerome, and became a feature as he would always appear in the background of her videos when she moved in; Malygon described him as" funny" and "unintentionally dramatic", and viewers approved of him, leading to him becoming a permanent staple. She has stated that in real life she is essentially his butler, remarking that she is always helping him with his phone and passwords.

Malygon has also become a creator on OnlyFans. She describes it as her "creative playground" and attributes it to her attaining financial stability. She has also stated that its the platform where creators face the least judgement.

In June 2025, she supposedly made a video and photoshoot with Tesla's Optimus. This led to claims that Tesla had officially partnered with her, which was repeated in media sources. However, the alleged Optimus was not real, and Elon Musk denied the collaboration with Malygon, stating that he had "no idea who that is", before going on to suggest that her images were likely computer generated.

She has also done modeling, participating in Paris Fashion Week in October 2025. In 2026, she was a part of GCDS's "Modern Princess" campaign in the spring, under which she was the closing act at that season's Milan Fashion Week. Her inclusion was meant to capitalize on her online persona, accompanied by a photoshoot inside a Los Angeles castle-esque mansion. She has also been featured in Paper.

In 2024, she was featured in the music video for Kesha's song "Joyride". In 2026, she was featured in season 3 of the British reality competition Inside.

== Ukrainian advocacy ==
Driver's license portrait, taken between 2022 and 2026

Anna Malygon has used her platform to support her home country of Ukraine in the aftermath of the Russian invasion in 2022. She had left the country for Ontario six months prior to Vladimir Putin's announcement of the war in February 2022, and was unable to return as a result. On the anniversary of the war's start, on February 24, 2023, she briefly returned to her apartment in Kharkiv; videos by her that went viral on TikTok showed it still largely intact to her surprise, with moldy food, wormy food, and an iPhone that had been charging for a year.

In April 2024, Malygon again visited Ukraine, visiting cities near the frontlines. She made videos captioned with "I'm Ukrainian" and ones where she stood next to destroyed infrastructure and cars, announcing that she was going to pay $30 thousand to the Ukrainian military and sending aid to a unit. She also made a video with the Ukrainian National Guard's 13th Khartiia Brigade where she mimed lyrics from an unreleased 2010 song from Lana del Rey. (Note: The lyrics were "Everybody knows I'm a good girl, officer". At the time, it was popular on TikTok to jokingly sing this next to real police officers) Despite her support, reaction from netizens, including certain Ukrainians was mixed; she was accused of having not shown interest before, with many claiming that she was instead "posting photos from parties, travels, and filming in seductive outfits". The controversy worsened after an old photo emerged of Malygon with Russian pornographic actress Eva Elfie, who is listed on Myrotvorets, a controversial Ukrainian website dedicated to listing supposed enemies of Ukraine.

As an individual living in Los Angeles, she was affected by the fires that ravaged large parts of Southern California in early 2025. A friend of Malygon had her house burned down by the wildfire. She used her platform to appeal for aid, similar to Ukraine, with her declaring in a viral TikTok that "I live in California, but I feel like I'm back in Ukraine."

In October 2025, the official Instagram account for Volodymyr Zelensky briefly reposted a video of Malygon's. The repost was removed shortly afterwards, but Malygon was able to make a story about it, semi-sarcastically thanking Zelensky for the "engagement boost". The incident garnered some coverage from both Ukrainian and Russian media, the latter of which levied accusations that the repost was either proof of a dysfunctional Ukrainian political elite or, building upon prior accusations levied against her, that they shared similar traits regarding exploiting the Ukrainian plight to enrich themselves; some Russian media gave her the nickname of "Zelensky's OnlyFan".

== Filmography ==
Year	Title	Role	Ref.
2024	"Joyride"	Sadie the Stabber & The Crazyboys	
2026	Inside	Herself	
