= Boy Crazy =

2025 single by Kesha

Single by Kesha

from the album Period
- Released: May 16, 2025
- Genre: Hyperpop; Europop
- Length: 2:28
- Label: Kesha
- Songwriters: Kesha Sebert; Madison Love
- Composer: Zhone
- Producers: Zhone; Kesha

Kesha singles chronology
"Sugar Free Venom" (2025)	"Boy Crazy" (2025)	"Attention" (2025)

Music video
- "Boy Crazy" on YouTube

"Boy Crazy" is a song by American singer and songwriter Kesha. It was released on May 16, 2025, by her own self-titled record label as the fourth single from her sixth studio album, Period (2025). The single was written and produced by Kesha, with additional writing credit to Madison Love and production by Zhone. An accompanying music video was released on June 17, 2025. A remix version of the song featuring English singer Jade, was released on July 8, 2025.

== Background and release ==
The title of "Boy Crazy" was first teased after it was shown to be one of the character names in the "Joyride" music video. The song's title was teased again during Kesha's House of Kesha tour show-dates, where several dancers wore crop-tops with the titles of select songs from Period on them. The song was teased for the first time in October 2024, where it was played at a charity event Kesha and Pebe Sebert were hosting. Kesha played the song again at a show at the Boiler Room in Miami, Florida, on April 3, 2025. The single's release date was officially announced through social media on May 12, 2025, and released on May 16, 2025.

To further promote the single and Kesha's new app, Smash, a remix challenge was announced on May 22, 2025. Users who signed up for the platform would receive the official music stems to the song and create a remix. The winner of the contest would have their remix officially released by Kesha Records. On July 18, five remixes were released together on an EP.

A remix version featuring English singer, Jade, is included as a bonus track on the album. The collaboration was teased after Jade attended Kesha's set at Mighty Hoopla in June 2025. Both singers were headliners at the festival that year and Jade posted videos of her singing along to the track. The two exchanged Instagram comments teasing a possible collaboration. During an interview when asked about potential collaborations, Kesha was listed as a possibility, where Jade was asked to blink to confirm it.

== Composition ==
"Boy Crazy" is a "upbeat", "thumping", and "high energy" hyperpop and Europop anthem that sees Kesha singing about "wanting to collect romantic partners from around the world" from the perspective of a "horny" and "wild-hearted femme fatale".

== Music video ==
The official music video was released on June 17, 2025. It was directed by Kesha, along with Brent Loudermilk and Zain Curtis. Among the cast features several notable models, porn stars, and dancers of the Los Angeles nightlife scene. The video sees the singer surrounded by the diverse cast of men wearing amounts of clothing that vary, as they sit down for a feast in a rodeo themed restaurant, referencing The Last Supper. The restaurant unravels into chaos as the group eat and drink and perform sexual acts on the table. The video is intercut with shots of a nearly nude Kesha while she rides on the back of a topless man and holds out pink panties like a piñata. At the end of the video, a grown man breastfeeds from an angelic looking Kesha.

== Track listing ==
Digital download and streaming

1. "Boy Crazy" – 2:28
2. "Yippee-Ki-Yay" (featuring T-Pain) – 3:32
3. "Delusional" – 3:15
4. "Joyride" – 2:30

Digital download and streaming (Only Fire Smash Remix)

1. "Boy Crazy" (Only Fire Smash Remix) – 3:02
2. "Boy Crazy" – 2:28

Digital download and streaming (Smash Remixes)

1. "Boy Crazy" (Cute Boys remix) – 2:57
2. "Boy Crazy" (HYP remix) - 2:47
3. "Boy Crazy" (Robots With Rayguns remix) – 3:13
4. "Boy Crazy" (Emmil remix) – 4:09
5. "Boy Crazy" (Corrado Lark remix) – 3:06

== Charts ==
Chart performance for "Boy Crazy"
Chart (2025)	Peak position
New Zealand Hot Singles (RMNZ)	38
US Dance Digital Song Sales (Billboard)	7

== Release history ==
"Boy Crazy" release history
Region	Date	Formats	Version	Label	Ref.
Various	May 16, 2025	Digital download; streaming	Original	Kesha	
Various	May 30, 2025	Digital download; streaming	Only Fire Smash remix	Kesha	
Various	July 18, 2025	Digital download; streaming	Smash remixes	Kesha	
Various	November 2026	7-inch vinyl	Jade remix	Kesha	
