= Origami! =

Single by Kesha
- Released: May 8, 2026
- Genre: Electropop
- Length: 2:34
- Label: Kesha
- Songwriters: Kesha Sebert; Kyle Buckley; JBach; Skyler Stonestreet
- Composer: Kyle Buckley
- Producers: Kesha; Kyle Buckley

Kesha singles chronology
| "Red Flag" (2026) | "Origami!" (2026) | "DJ Turn It Down" (2026) |

Music video
- "Origiami!" on YouTube

"Origami!" (stylized in all caps) is a song by American singer and songwriter Kesha. It was released on May 8, 2026, by her own self-titled record label. The single was written and produced by Kesha, with additional writing credit to Kyle Buckley and JBach and production by Buckley and Kesha.

== Background and development ==
Kesha said that she wrote the song as a, "celebration of survival, liberation and radical joy". Additionally, she said that, "Origami!" is a celebration of sex. Wherever and with whoever you choose to have it with! It’s about embracing freedom and self-love that we all deserve".

== Promotion ==
To promote the single, Kesha held an open verse contest on her music connecting platform, Smash. Artists were encouraged to submit an original verse for "Origami!" that would replace the second verse. Similar to the open verse contest for her single, "Attention!", the finalists would have a chance to have their version officially released through Kesha's independent record label.

== Music video ==
The official music video was released on May 24, 2026. It was directed by Kesha, along with Brett Loudermilk and Zain Curtis, and choreographed by Robbie Blue. Gayety said the video delivers a "playful, sex-positive visual" leaning into uninhibited self-expression, and erotic energy".

== Reception ==
DraftKings Network gave the song a positive review, stating "Origami! points toward Kesha’s raunchy, wink-heavy club-pop register: chant-ready hooks, body-forward imagery, travel-gloss fantasy, and the central fold-me-up metaphor carried directly through the title".

== Live performance ==
During a surprise DJ set for Live Nation in San Francisco, Kesha performed the track for the first time. The song was included on her setlist for the Freedom Tour (2026).
