= Blusher (band) =

Australian pop band

- Origin: Melbourne, Australia
- Genres: Pop, dance, electronic
- Years active: 2021–present
- Labels: Atlantic Records, Warner Music Australia
- Members: Miranda Ward; Jade Ingvarson-Favretto; Lauren Coutts

Blusher is an Australian pop band formed in Melbourne in 2021. The trio consists of Miranda Ward, Jade Ingvarson-Favretto, and Lauren Coutts. Each member had solo music careers before forming Blusher following the COVID-19 pandemic, aiming to create energetic, danceable pop music.

Their debut single, "Softly Spoken", released in February 2022, gained traction on Triple J Unearthed.

In 2023, they released their debut EP, Should We Go Dance?.

The group has toured internationally, supporting artists like Aurora, Tove Lo, Sugababes, Daði Freyr, NOTD, and Kesha. They have also performed at major events such as London Pride and BST Hyde Park.

== History ==
=== 2021–2022: Formation and early work ===
Blusher formed in late 2021. Miranda Ward, Jade Ingvarson-Favretto, and Lauren Coutts were all solo musicians before uniting to make music inspired by the joy of dancing with friends, especially after the isolation of the COVID-19 pandemic.

Their debut single "Softly Spoken" was released in February 2022. It was praised by Triple J presenter Declan Byrne and included in the station's Top 5 Songs of the Week. The song led them to sign with Atlantic Records and Warner Music Australia.

=== 2023: Breakthrough and Atlantic Records ===
In June 2023, the group released "Backbone" and announced their debut EP Should We Go Dance? would be released on 14 July 2023.

In 2024, Blusher released five singles, "Rave Angel", "Accelerator", "24 Hours in Paris", "Overglow" and "Somebody New".

In 2025, Blusher collaborated with Mecca Max on a beauty campaign featuring their single "Racer".

Their second EP Racer was released on 31 July 2025.

In 2025, Blusher returned to Australia for Triple J's One Night Stand and participated in the "Perfect Sunday" segment.

== Members ==
=== Miranda Ward ===
A classically trained musician and guitarist, Ward previously pursued a solo career combining classical and pop elements. She met Coutts in Brisbane before being introduced to Ingvarson-Favretto in Melbourne.

=== Jade Ingvarson-Favretto ===
Ingvarson-Favretto began performing in an ABBA tribute act with her parents before launching her solo career. She met the other members through Coutts.

=== Lauren Coutts ===
A producer and multi-instrumentalist, Coutts had a solo career before forming Blusher. She played a central role in uniting the group and leads much of their production and songwriting.

== Discography ==
=== Extended plays ===
List of EPs, with selected details
Title	Details	Peak chart positions
Title	Details	AUS
Should We Go Dance?	Released: 14 July 2023; Label: Atlantic/ Warner Music Australia; Format: Digital	—
Racer	Released: 31 July 2025; Label: Atlantic/ Warner Music Australia; Format: Digital	45 (Note: Rager and Racer were released as a double EP in February 2026. ARIA lists the title as Racer)
Rager	Released: 6 February 2026; Label: Atlantic/Warner Music Australia; Formats: Digital, 2×CD; Note: Remix EP	45

== Singles ==
As lead artist
Title	Year	Album
"Softly Spoken"	2022	Should We Go Dance?
"Dead End"	2023	Should We Go Dance?
"Backbone"	2023	Should We Go Dance?
"Rave Angel"	2024	Non-album singles
"Accelerator"	2024	Non-album singles
"24 Hours in Paris"	2024	Non-album singles
"Overglow"	2024	Non-album singles
"Somebody New"	2024	Non-album singles
"Racer"	2025	Racer
"Whatever Whatever"	2025	Racer
"Last Man Standing"	2025	Racer
"Rager"	2026	Rager
"Your Love Is My Drug" (Like a Version)	2026	Non-album single
"Mrs. Brightside"	2026	TBA

Remixes
Title	Year	Ref.
"Rhetorical Questions" (Gracey – Blusher Remix)	2024	
"Troy" (Ivoris – Blusher Remix)	2024	
"Glow" (Kesha – Blusher Remix)	2026	

== Tours ==
- 2024: Australian Headline Tour
- 2025: Racer Tour

== Awards and nominations ==
=== ARIA Music Awards ===
The ARIA Music Awards is an annual awards ceremony that recognises excellence, innovation, and achievement across all genres of Australian music.

Year	Nominee / work	Award	Result	Ref.
2026	"Rager"	Best Pop Release	Nominated	
