= Dinosaur (Kesha song) =

Song by Kesha

from the album Animal
- Released: January 1, 2010
- Recorded: 2007
- Studio: Maratone Studios (Stockholm, Sweden)
- Length: 2:55
- Label: RCA
- Songwriters: Kesha Sebert; Max Martin; Shellback
- Producers: Max Martin; Shellback

"Dinosaur" (stylized as "D.I.N.O.$.A.U.R.") is a song by American singer Kesha from her debut studio album, Animal (2010). Kesha wrote it in collaboration with Max Martin and Shellback; the latter two also produced the song, while all three are responsible for the instrumentation. The song's conception stems from an encounter Kesha had with an older man who had been hitting on her, which she compared to a prehistoric dinosaur. The lyrics discuss an older man who attempts to hit on a younger woman, who ultimately rejects him. The song received generally negative reviews from music critics.

== Writing and inspiration ==
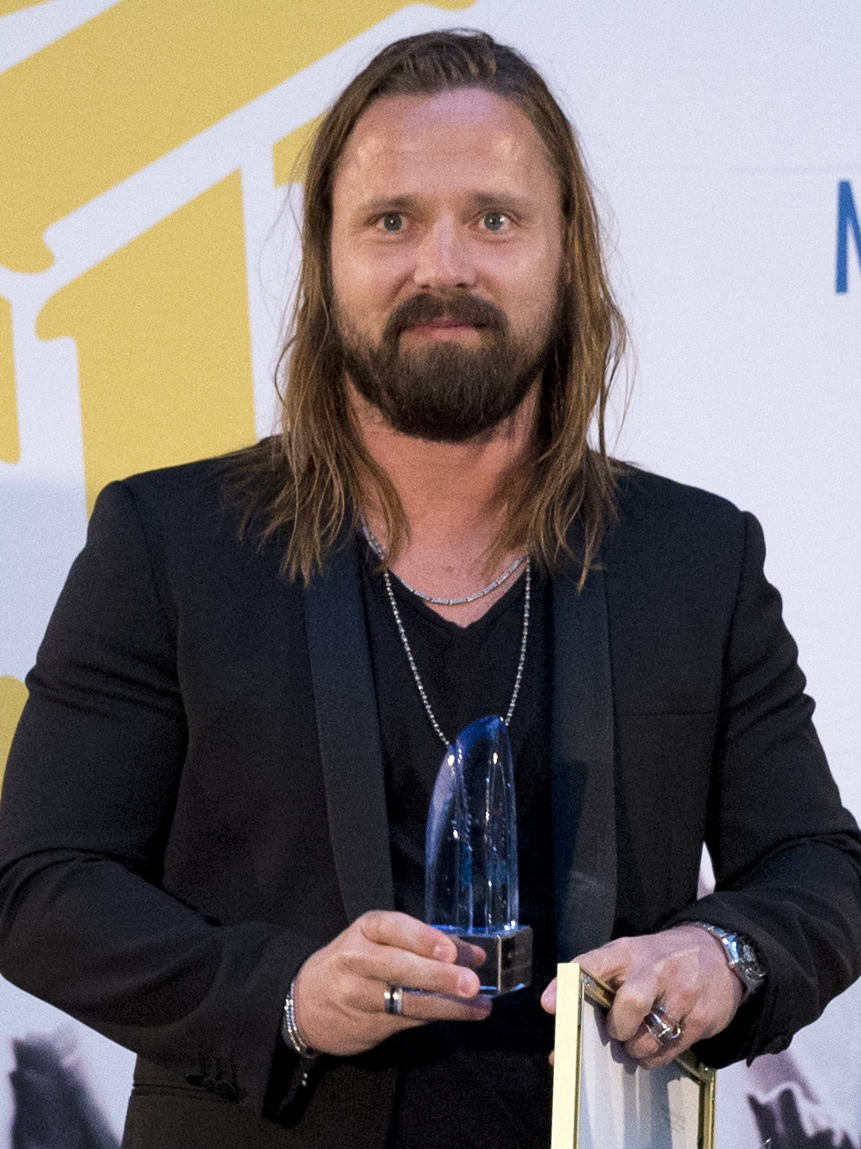
Max Martin (pictured) co-wrote the song.

"Dinosaur" is a song written by Kesha Sebert, in collaboration with Max Martin, Shellback; the latter two are responsible for the song's production. The song's lyrics and conception use a metaphor, comparing an older man to a prehistoric, carnivorous dinosaur. All three composers were responsible for providing the song's instruments. The song's recording was commenced at Maratone Studios, in Stockholm, Sweden, by Martin and Shellback. While being interviewed by Rolling Stone, Kesha was asked about her writing technique and how her songs come to fruition, which she explained using "Dinosaur" as an example. The singer explained that the song's conception was auto-biographical and that it stemmed from a previous experience she had when an older man had been hitting on her, which she elaborated on: "I just write about what I live — literally, my entire record is totally autobiographical, because I think there's a great pop song in anything and everything, any situation. There's a song called 'Dinosaur' about this old guy who was hitting on me, and his toupee was kind of falling off, and I was like, 'Oh my God, you're so old, you're prehistoric, you're like a dinosaur. D-I-N-O-S-A-you are a dinosaur.'"

== Composition ==
"Dinosaur"
"Dinosaur" is composed in a jungle beat tempo and incorporates a whistle-synth. The lyrics discuss an older gentleman attempting to flirt with younger females.

"Dinosaur" is written in the key of E major and the tempo moves at 128 beats per minute at a jungle beat. Kesha's vocal range in the song spans from the lower note of E_{3} to the higher note of E_{5}. It encompasses keyboards, a cowbell, and a whistle in its production, the latter of which has been described as a "whistle-synth." The song's lyrics revolve around an older man who is attempting to persuade a younger girl to leave the club with him, to which the protagonist responds with "a scattergun spray of insults."

Mike Usinger of The Georgia Straight described the song as a "percussion-bombed snot-rapper". According to Andrew Burgess of MusicOMH, "Dinosaur" features a "Mark Mothersbaugh-like whistle-synth" and focuses on "the grossness of older men hitting on younger girls". Burgess cites the line "hey carnivore, you want my meat, I know it" as evidence for this. The UrbanWire's Cheryl Chia noted that the song is similar to "Girlfriend" by Avril Lavigne and Gwen Stefani's "Hollaback Girl", while Monica Herrera of Billboard found it reminiscent of Vanity 6. According to Althea Legaspi of the Chicago Tribune, "Dinosaur" contains "lyrical merit in that most women have experienced unwanted advances from a creepy way-too-old man".

== Critical reception ==
"Dinosaur" received generally negative reviews from most music critics. Ian Gittins of The Guardian called it a "bitchy put-down of ageing suitors". Doug Rule of Metro Weekly criticized the song's chorus, which according to him is "spelt out like a "modern-day Toni Basil", saying: "Are we supposed to think that's cute, even clever? It's neither." The UrbanWire's Cheryl Chia was critical of the song, saying that it "has the potential to be very annoying after a few rounds." Billboard's Monica Herrera also gave a negative review. She used the song as an example of one of the album Animal's "missteps", stating that it could "only appeal to the most heartless of teens". Ailbhe Malone of NME stated that "Dinosaur" contains the pay-off "Honey, your toupee is falling to the left side/Get up and go bro/Oh wait, you're fossilized".

Fraser McAlpine of BBC Music was positive in his review of the song. McAlpine felt that "Dinosaur" was the album's best track, and went on to note that its conception was enough to "drive rock-bores into a state of spluttering fury." McAlpine's consensus on the song was that "it is made of nothing but sugar and sass and additives, a song from a young girl to an older man who is attempting to pick her up in a club. All she has to offer him is a scattergun spray of insults, and cutie-pie whistling. It's childish and Parental Advisory Required at the same time, and is going to infuriate any adult within hearing range."

== Live performances and covers ==
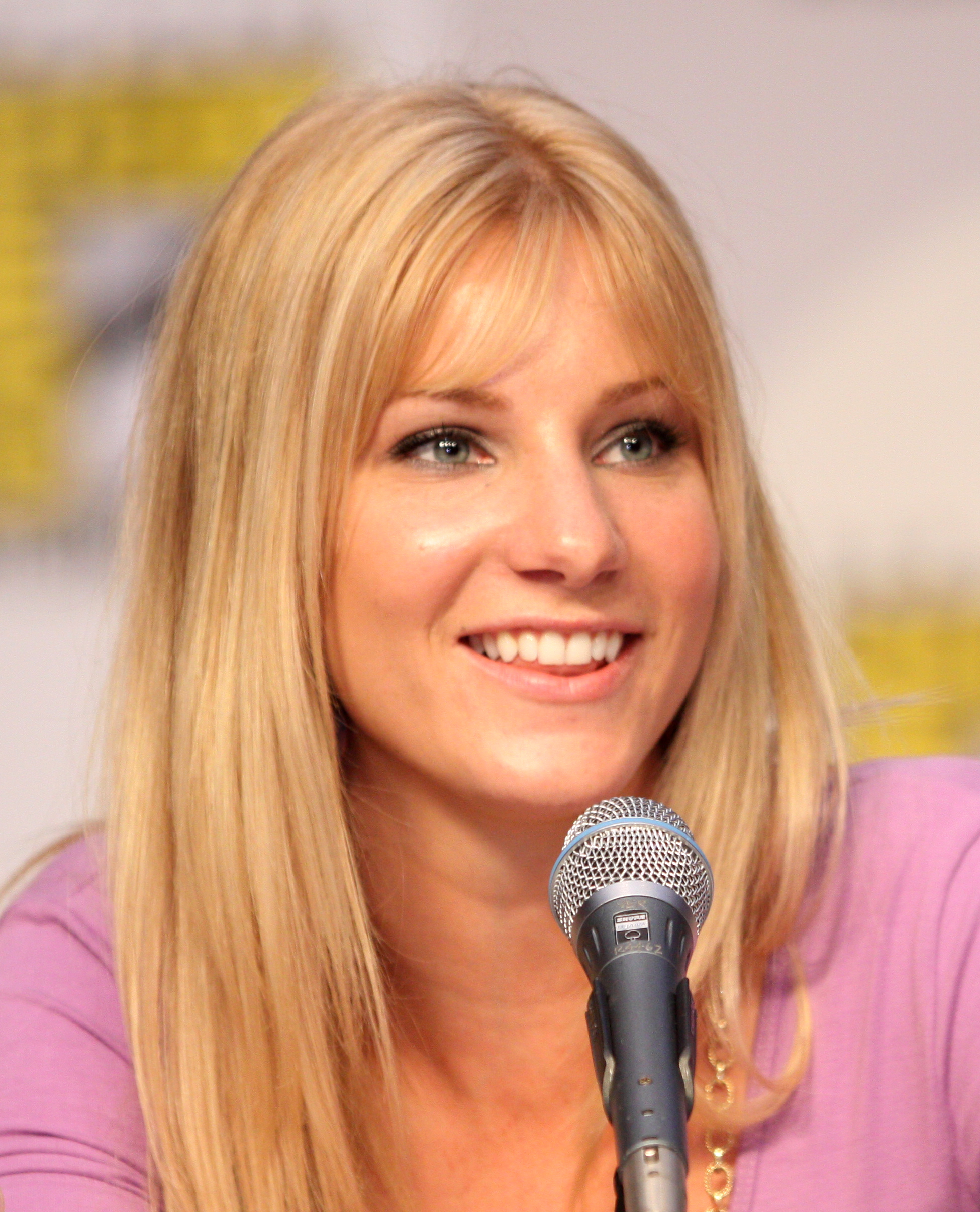
Actress Heather Morris (pictured) covered the song in the television series Glee, aired on May 8, 2012.

The song was first performed live for MTV Push, a program broadcast by MTV Networks worldwide. The song was later performed as part of her world tour, the Get Sleazy Tour, as it was part of the concert's set-list. During the performance, Kesha was backed with dancers and band members that were dressed in an array of dinosaur costumes. Actress Heather Morris covered the song in the television series Glee in the episode titled "Prom-asaurus". It was aired on May 8, 2012, and is the 19th episode of the third season. The episode's plot revolves around prom with its theme involving dinosaurs. Morris' character, Brittany S. Pierce, covered the song in the episode, performing a choreographed dance routine to it. Erica Futterman of Rolling Stone wrote that the episode's performance was "a small victory", and concluded that it was the best performance of that episode. Erin Strecker of Entertainment Weekly wrote that the song was "Auto-Tuned within an inch of its life", but praised Morris' performance, writing "but Brittany can totally move." Glee's cover was released for digital download through the iTunes Store on May 8, 2012.

== Credits and personnel ==
Credits are adapted from the liner notes of Animal.

Recording

- Recorded by Max Martin and Shellback at Maratone Studios, Stockholm, Sweden.

Personnel

- Songwriting – Kesha Sebert, Max Martin, Shellback
- Production – Max Martin, Shellback for Maratone Productions
- Keyboards – Max Martin
- Cowbell – Kesha
- Whistle – Kesha, Shellback

== Charts ==
Chart performance
Chart (2010)	Peak position
South Korea (Circle)	115
UK Singles (Official Charts)	180

== Certifications ==
Region	Certification	Certified units/sales
United States (RIAA)	Gold	500,000^{‡}
^{‡} Sales+streaming figures based on certification alone.
