= We R Who We R =

2010 single by Kesha

Single by Kesha

from the EP Cannibal
- B-side: "Sleazy"
- Released: October 22, 2010
- Recorded: 2010
- Studio: Conway Recording Studios (Los Angeles, CA)
- Genre: Dance-pop; EDM; techno
- Length: 3:24
- Label: RCA
- Songwriters: Kesha Sebert; Joshua Coleman; Lukasz Gottwald; Jacob Kasher Hindlin; Benjamin Levin
- Producers: Dr. Luke; Benny Blanco; Ammo

Kesha singles chronology
"Take It Off" (2010)	"We R Who We R" (2010)	"Blow" (2011)

Music video
- "We R Who We R" on YouTube

"We R Who We R" is a song by American singer Kesha from her first extended play (EP), Cannibal (2010). The song was released as the EP's lead single on October 22, 2010. It was written by Kesha, with Jacob Kasher Hindlin, Dr. Luke, Benny Blanco and Ammo. Production of the song was completed by Dr. Luke, Blanco, and Ammo. In the wake of news that bullying and harassment had led to multiple suicides of gay youth, Kesha wrote the song in hopes that it would become a pride anthem. The song is intended to inspire people to be themselves, and as a celebration of anyone deemed quirky or eccentric.

Musically, the song is a dance-pop song that incorporates elements of electropop; it uses a synth-infused beat as a backing with sounds interpreted as hand claps. Kesha's vocals have been described as a talk-singing style that use layered Auto-Tune in some parts and vocoders. The song has been compared to her debut single "Tik Tok" (2009), as it has a similar musical structure.

"We R Who We R" debuted at number one on the Billboard Hot 100, making it the 17th song in the chart's history to do so. The song also reached number one on the United Kingdom Singles Chart, Kesha's first number-one solo single there, and topped the charts in Australia for three weeks. It also attained top-five positions on the Canadian Hot 100, as well as the Japanese, and New Zealand charts. The song became Kesha's fifth consecutive solo top-ten hit in the United States, Canada, and Australia. It is certified six-times Platinum by the Recording Industry Association of America (RIAA) in the United States and five-times Platinum in Australia.

The song's accompanying music video was directed by Hype Williams and was filmed in downtown Los Angeles. The video is presented as an underground party and has been described as showcasing a darker and sexier side of Kesha compared to previous videos. The song has been performed in North America at the 2010 American Music Awards, and on her worldwide Get Sleazy Tour.

== Writing and inspiration ==
In late 2010, there was a sudden surge in suicide rates amongst gay teenagers in the United States. In September 2010, at least six adolescents took their lives due to factors related to gay bullying. After reading about the surge of gay teen suicides, Kesha was inspired to write "We R Who We R", along with Dr. Luke, Benny Blanco, Ammo, and Jacob Kasher Hindlin. Production of the song was completed by Luke alongside Blanco and Ammo. After receiving 6 nominations at the 2011 Billboard Music Awards, Kesha elaborated on the song's initial inspiration. She stated that she was concerned with today's society, criticizing the fact that people have to hide themselves and pretend to be someone other than who they are. Regarding her music she said that it was not for everyone, claiming that she is a misfit in society and not everyone understands her or what she stands for.

Kesha explained that she wanted the song to become a Pride anthem; "I wanted to inspire people ... to be themselves. It's a celebration of any sort of quirks or eccentricities." She elaborated, "I was really affected by the suicides that have been happening, having been subject to very public hatred [myself]. I have absolutely no idea how these kids felt. What I'm going through is nothing compared to what they had to go through. Just know things do get better and you need to celebrate who you are. Every weird thing about you is beautiful and makes life interesting. Hopefully the song really captures that emotion of celebrating who you are ... I just felt like people hate because they don't understand or they're jealous, It's all coming from a very negative place and I really feel like people don't need to pay attention to that."

== Composition ==
"We R Who We R" (2010)
"We R Who We R" is an upbeat dance-pop song that uses a synth-infused beat and makes use of auto-tune.

"We R Who We R" is an uptempo dance-pop and EDM song that uses a synth-heavy backing; the song incorporates techno and electropop styles. Opening with a synth-infused backing and sounds interpreted as hand claps, Kesha opens the song by proclaiming, "Hot and dangerous if you're one of us, then roll with us 'Cause we make the hipsters fall in love". Vocally, the song follows in the footsteps of Kesha's previous singles, as Kesha uses her talk-singing vocal style throughout the song. Kesha uses layered vocals that are enhanced in some parts with the use of Auto-Tune. Musically, the song has been said to follow a musical structure similar to her debut single, "Tik Tok" (2009).

According to sheet music published at Musicnotes.com by Sony/ATV Music Publishing, "We R Who We R" is written in the time signature of common time, with a moderate beat rate of 120 beats per minute. The song is written in the key of C minor; Kesha's vocal range spans from the note of E♭_{4} to the note of E♭_{5}. It has a basic sequence of Cm–Fm–E♭–A♭ as its chord progression.

Blanco noted that the bridge of the song was originally planned to have additional vocals from Kesha, but due to a time crunch and a tight deadline, it was instead completed in less than 30 minutes by repeatedly sampling the "DJ, turn it up" lyric from the second verse.

== Critical reception ==
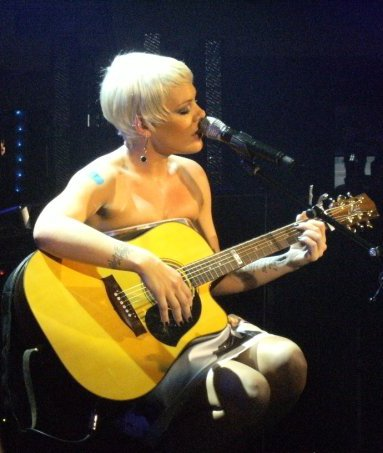
"We R Who We R" was compared to fellow pop singer Pink's (pictured) track "Raise Your Glass" for their similar inspiration.

Robert Copsey from Digital Spy gave the single five out of five stars. Copsey praised Kesha for not buckling under the harsh scrutiny she has been subject to over the length of her career, citing her boozy antics and processed vocals as areas that have been criticized. He wrote, "we've never disputed that she carries it all off in a fashion that's frank, fearless and unashamedly fun." The song's chorus was highlighted in the review, with Copsey calling it "her poppermost effort to date" that contained "bouncy Dr Luke beats and her usual bubblegum melodies".

Jocelyn Vena from MTV News gave the song a positive review, writing "[Kesha] has found a chart-topping formula, combin[ing] killer beats with lyrics about super-fun parties and hot pants." Vena commented that, although the song was not groundbreaking and did not stray too far away from previous singles "Tik Tok" or "Take It Off", that hardly matters as "it's another uber-fun tune about how awesome it is to dance the night away" with an "inspired [message about] the recent rash of suicides among gay youth." Jason Lipshutz from Billboard gave the song a positive review; he praised Dr. Luke's production and the song's chorus. Lipshutz commented on the song's similarity to "Tik Tok", writing, "Instead of straying from the 'TiK ToK' formula, 'We R Who We R,' ... smartly maximizes [Kesha's] most appealing qualities." The review concluded that the song "demonstrates that [Kesha] still has mileage left in her electro-pop sound as she gears up for her next album." Leah Greenblatt of Entertainment Weekly called the song a "companion piece" to Pink's "Raise Your Glass" citing their similar subject matter and close releases. Nitsuh Abebe from New York magazine complimented the song's chorus and trance pop elements. Abebe wrote that the song embodied a "hollowed-out, free-of-yourself feeling", commenting that almost all electronic dance music imbues feelings "that are almost spiritual, that sense of being subsumed and out-of-body". Melinda Newman of HitFix called the song "incredibly stupid, but it has the main ingredients to make it a global hit: an insistent beat and positive lyrics that promise to suspend time and keep us 'forever young,' or better yet, transport us back to a time when we felt like we were." Newman referred to herself as one of the singer's biggest detractors, but wrote, "I like one of her songs--or at least begrudgingly admire its crass charms." In an album review of Cannibal, Newman referred to the song as a "great self-acceptance anthem.'

Alex Hawgood from The New York Times wrote that at first listen the song came across as another generic dance hit. Hawgood however praised the song for its hidden subtext intended to be a response to gay suicides. Hawgood compared the song to the likes of Taylor Swift, Pink, Katy Perry and Lady Gaga, all of which "represent a new wave of young (and mostly straight) women who are providing the soundtrack for a generation of gay fans coming to terms with their identity in a time of turbulent and confusing cultural messages." Sal Cinquemani of Slant Magazine called the track "infectious" and praised her honesty and sincerity on the track. AllMusic's Stephen Thomas Erlewine chose "We R Who We R" as a highlight on Cannibal. The Phoenix' Daniel Brockman felt that the song had a "lifting anthemic heft" while Spin's Barry Walters said that with the song, "she sends out pride vibes to bullied gays." Rolling Stone's Will Hermes called the song "awesome." Steven Hyden from The A.V. Club, in the album review of Cannibal, wrote that her "let's get fucking fucked-up" attitude on the track was a positive calling her "a complete and utter genius." Hyden reviewed the song alongside fellow editor Genevieve Koski in a separate publication, giving the song a B and a D+, respectively. Hyden reiterated his comments from the album review in his review of the song, but added that the song was sonically similar to her previous singles "Tik Tok" and "Take It Off", adding that on the song she "seems a little more self-aware, imploring each and every one of us to start 'dancing like we're dumb.'". On the opposite end up the spectrum, Koski was critical of the song, criticizing her vocals with his consensus being that "I want to give every Kesha song an 'F' on principle, but objectively speaking, I know there are far worse songs out there, so let's average out a subjective F and an objective C+ to a D+."

In a separate publishing from The New York Times, David Browne criticized the song's overuse of processed vocals, writing that: "As heard on her current single 'We R Who We R' from her new mini-album, Cannibal, Kesha has a thin, often computer-manipulated voice that recalls '80s new-wave pop acts. It's often hard to tell when her singing voice ends and the Vocoder processing kicks in." Rolling Stone gave the song two and a half stars out of five, referring to the combination of Kesha's style and the song's themes as an "awkward fit". However, Rolling Stone later placed the song at number 50 in its Best 50 Singles of 2010 list.

== Commercial performance ==
In the United States, "We R Who We R" debuted at number one on the Billboard Hot 100, selling over 280,000 digital copies. The song was the 17th song in the history of the chart to debut at number one and became Kesha's fifth straight top-ten hit in the United States, and her second number one. In the same week the song ranked at number one on Billboard's Digital Songs chart. On the Mainstream Top 40 airplay chart the song rose 124% in airplay, when compared to the previous week, and jumped from 36 to 23 on that week's chart. The following week, the song dropped from number one to position five, as it sold another 220,000 copies. After being present on the charts for five weeks, the song reached one million paid downloads, the fastest-selling song to reach the one million download mark since "Love the Way You Lie" by Eminem and Rihanna did so earlier in 2010. During the song's ninth week on the chart it sold 319,000 copies; the following week it sold 411,000 copies and surpassed the two million paid downloads mark. With this feat, the song became one of only ten songs to sell more than 300,000 copies in a single week more than once. On Billboard's Hot Dance Club Songs and Pop chart, the song reached peaks of 27 and two, respectively. The song reached its 4 million sales mark in the United States in January 2014, her second song to reach that level. As of March 2016, the song has sold 4.1 million copies in the US. As of 2024, the song has since received a 6× Platinum certification by the Recording Industry Association of America (RIAA) for accumulating sales of 6 million equivalent units in the United States.

On the Canadian Hot 100, the song debuted and peaked at number two, selling 21,000 digital downloads. In Australia, "We R Who We R" debuted at number one on the chart on the issue date entitled November 17, 2010. The song remained atop the charts for two weeks before dropping to the number two position. The following week, the single regained the number one position and held it for one week, giving the single a total of three weeks atop the chart. It has since been certified quadruple Platinum by the Australian Recording Industry Association (ARIA) for sales of 280,000 units. In New Zealand, the song debuted and peaked at number four on the Official Top 40 Singles chart in its first week. The song has since been certified double Platinum by Recorded Music NZ (RMNZ) for sales of 60,000 units. In Sweden, "We R Who We R" debuted on the chart at position 22, which was its peak. The song has since been certified gold for sales of 10,000 units by the Swedish Recording Industry Association (GLF). In the United Kingdom, "We R Who We R" entered the UK Singles Chart at position 95 on the issue dated January 8, 2011, and dropped off the chart the following week. After the release of the single on January 23, 2011, the song re-entered the chart at number one, selling in excess of 90,000 copies and becoming Kesha's first solo number one in the UK and second overall. As of December 2011, the single has sold 326,000 copies in the United Kingdom.

== Music video ==
=== Background ===
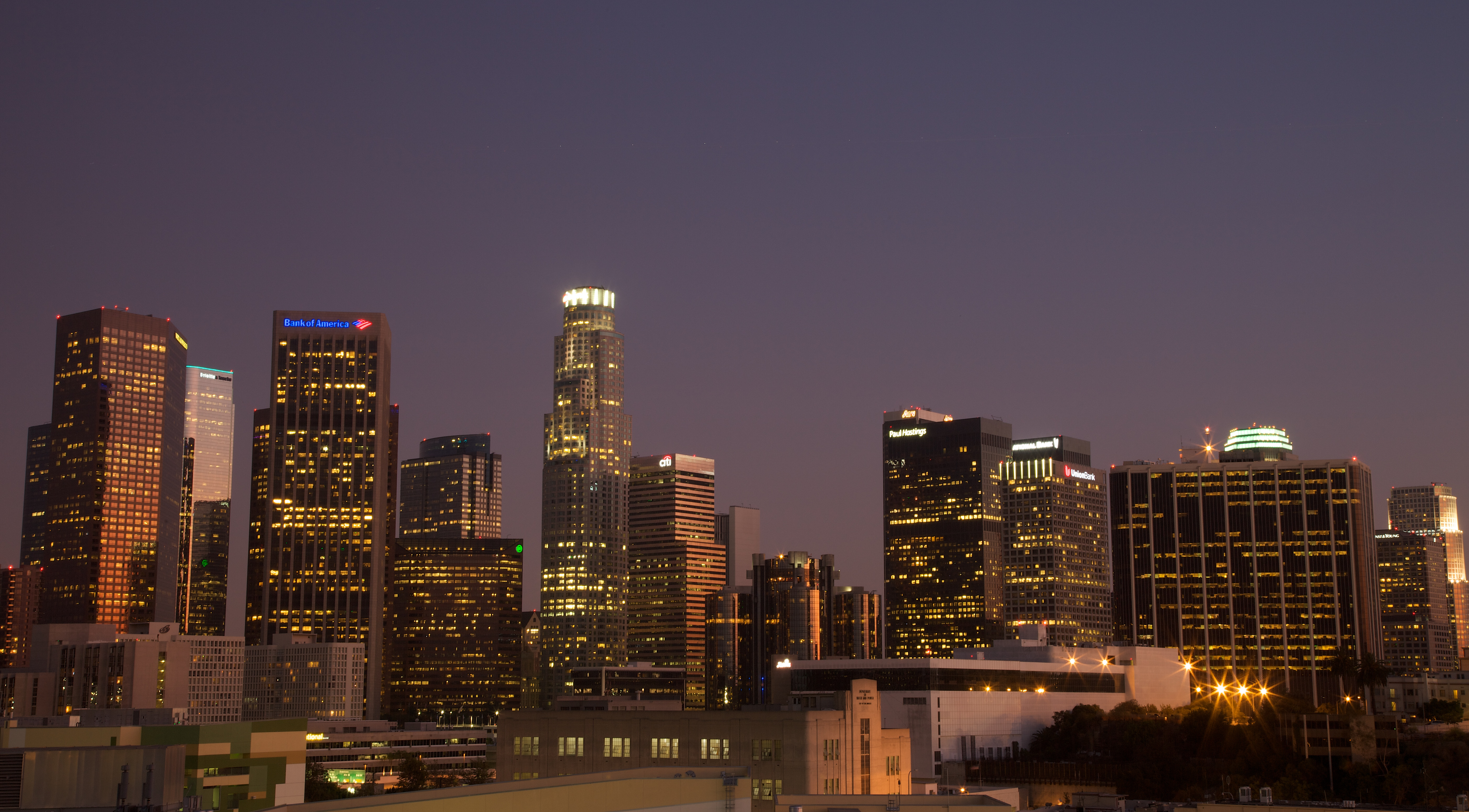
An overview image of Downtown Los Angeles, where the video was initially filmed over a 48-hour period

The music video for the song was directed by Hype Williams and was filmed in downtown Los Angeles. Filming of the video involved a partial closure of the 2nd Street Tunnel and part of downtown Los Angeles spread out over a 48-hour period. Kesha explained the idea behind the video as well as the experience during an interview with MTV News; she said that the video was different from her other videos, noting that it was going to show a sexier side of herself.

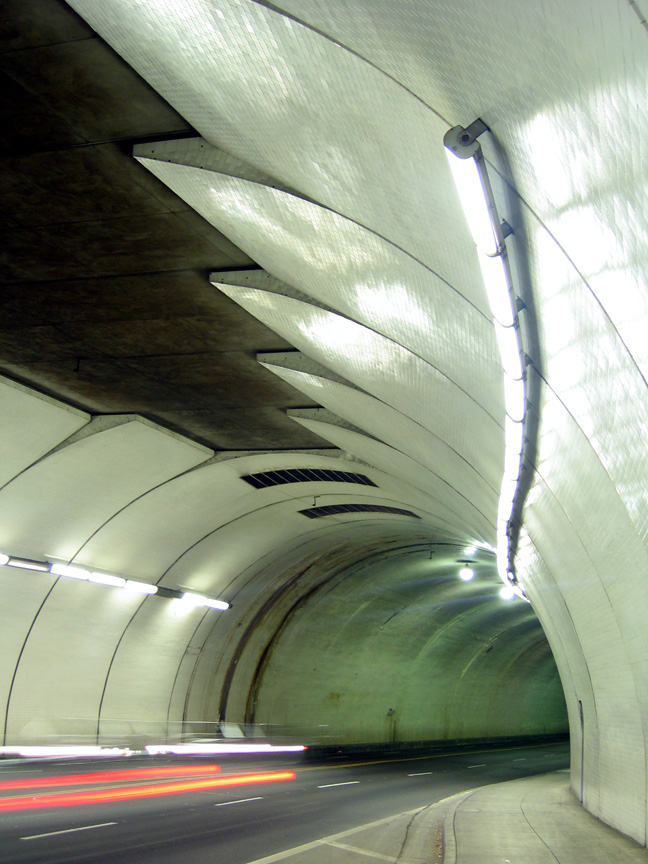
2nd Street Tunnel, as seen in the music video for "We R Who We R"

The music video for "We R Who We R" is presented as an underground party.

=== Synopsis and reception ===
The video starts off with futuristic flashing lights. Kesha, seen in a ponytail wearing gray and black makeup, chains, ripped stockings, and a sparkly one-piece leotard made of shards of broken glass, walks through the 2nd Street Tunnel with fellow partygoers. The scene features drag races and explosions in the background. Close-up shots of Kesha show her wearing studs in her eyebrows and her glittery eye makeup. As cars zoom by, the video transitions to a new location at a different party. Midway through the party Kesha changes outfits to an American-flag top and pink hot pants. As the song's hook kicks in, Kesha is seen standing on the edge of a building; the music stops and Kesha stage jumps backwards off of the building's rooftop. She is caught by the partygoers beneath her and the music resumes. The final scenes show Kesha dancing among fellow partygoers on a rooftop and smiling while singing "We R Who We R". Jocelyn Vena from MTV News noted that the video makes a departure from Kesha's previous music videos, in which humor is usually present; she wrote the video shows a "darker and sexier" side of the singer. Tanner Stransky from Entertainment Weekly was positive in his review of the video. Stransky commented on the song's lyrical inspiration, noting the video does not follow the same message, saying "it doesn't so much inspire self esteem as much as it inspires just a plain ol', trashy, [Kesha]-ed out good time. Code word: party!". The video was uploaded to her Vevo account on December 1, 2010.

== Live performances ==
"We R Who We R" was performed for the first time on the second season of The X Factor Australia on November 14, 2010. Prior to the performance a minor controversy was sparked when Kesha's male background dancers were seen wearing red armbands that had been supplied locally. Kesha was concerned they could be mistaken for a swastika, so the armbands were removed. "We R Who We R" was performed live for the first time in North America on November 21, 2010, at the 2010 American Music Awards. The performance started off with Kesha opening with her previous single, "Take It Off", while playing on the keyboard; she soon transitioned into "We R Who We R". For the performance she wore a mirrored body suit and a black leather jacket. Male background dancers surrounded the stage throughout the performance. Confetti fell from the ceiling during the song's synth-filled finale and as the performance ended, Kesha played riffs on a guitar. She then turned the guitar around, revealing the word "hate" in black writing with a slash through it. She then smashed the guitar into pieces, ending the performance. In 2011, Kesha embarked on her first headlining tour, the Get Sleazy Tour, where she performed "We R Who We R" alongside a cover of Beastie Boys track "(You Gotta) Fight for Your Right (To Party!)", as a part of the concert's encore. At the 2013 Kids' Choice Awards, Kesha performed a segment of "We R Who We R" and "C'Mon".

== Cultural impact ==
In 2010, "We R Who We R" gained widespread support from the gay community. Dan Savage, the original creator of the "It Gets Better" campaign, which Kesha participated in, stated that she and other music artists that wrote songs addressed to the gay community were vital in helping fans come to terms with their sexualities and identities. "These songs are countering a hateful message that a peer, family member, politician or a bully might be saying, I get frustrated with gay politicos who discount or undermine the importance of pop stars, They're a huge part of this fight." Singers Josh Erdman and Ben Klute began posting cover versions of various songs on YouTube, later adding a logo to their videos originally titled "Legalize Gay". They later stumbled upon Kesha's song and upon doing so they changed their logo to "Legalize Gay 'Cause We Are Who We Are". The duo changed the logo to represent the song stating, "The lyrics obviously spoke to us, What these artists are doing means the world to the gay community." In October 2011, Kesha teamed up with the Human Rights Campaign and designed a unisex T-shirt embroidered with purple zebra print – intended to represent "spirit" in the LGBT's pride flag. The shirt's design was titled with the writing "We R Who We R" and was made for that year's National Coming Out Day. Describing the song as "the spirit of 'School's Out in the body of techno", Simon Reynolds has hailed "We R Who We R" as "the greatest rave anthem of the twenty-first century – regardless of whether it's ever been played at a rave, which it probably hasn't."

== Track listing ==
- Digital download
1. "We R Who We R" – 3:24
- German CD
1. "We R Who We R" – 3:24
2. "Animal" (Dave Audé remix) – 4:37
- Digital download (extended play)
1. "We R Who We R" – 3:24
2. "Sleazy" – 3:25
3. "Animal" (Dave Audé remix) – 4:37
4. "Animal" (Billboard remix) – 4:15
- Digital download (Fred Falke radio mix)
1. "We R Who We R" (Fred Falke radio mix) – 4:33

== Credits and personnel ==
- Songwriting – Kesha Sebert, Joshua Coleman, Lukasz Gottwald, Jacob Kasher Hindlin, Benjamin Levin
- Production, instruments and programming – Dr. Luke, Benny Blanco, Ammo
- Background vocals – Rani Hancock, Lukasz Gottwald, Sam Holland, Benjamin Levin, Emily Wright
- Engineering – Emily Wright, Chris "TEK" O'Ryan, Sam Holland
- Assistant engineering – Tatiana Gottwald, Jeremy Levin

Credits adapted from the liner notes of Cannibal, Dynamite Cop Music/Where Da Kasz At BMI.

== Charts ==
=== Weekly ===
Weekly chart performance for "We R Who We R"
Chart (2010–2011)	Peak position
Australia (ARIA)	1
Austria (Ö3 Austria Top 40)	15
Belgium (Ultratop 50 Flanders)	13
Belgium (Ultratop 50 Wallonia)	11
Canada Hot 100 (Billboard)	2
Canada CHR/Top 40 (Billboard)	4
Canada Hot AC (Billboard)	4
Czech Republic Airplay (ČNS IFPI)	20
Denmark (Tracklisten)	31
Europe (Billboard Euro Digital Songs)	3
France (SNEP)	19
Germany (GfK)	23
Global Dance Songs (Billboard)	10
Hungary (Editors' Choice Top 40)	13
Ireland (IRMA)	10
Italy Airplay (EarOne)	50
Italy (FIMI)	33
Japan Hot 100 (Billboard)	5
Japan Adult Contemporary (Billboard)	1
Lithuania (European Hit Radio)	3
Mexico Airplay (Billboard)	42
Mexico Ingles Airplay (Billboard)	4
Netherlands (Dutch Top 40 Tipparade)	9
Netherlands (Single Top 100)	42
New Zealand (Recorded Music NZ)	4
Norway (VG-lista)	13
Poland (Polish Airplay New)	4
Scottish Singles Sales (Official Charts)	1
Slovakia Airplay (ČNS IFPI)	4
South Korea (Circle)	89
South Korea Foreign (Circle)	4
Spain (Promusicae)	26
Sweden (Sverigetopplistan)	22
Switzerland (Schweizer Hitparade)	17
UK Singles (Official Charts)	1
US Billboard Hot 100	1
US Adult Pop Airplay (Billboard)	19
US Dance Club Songs (Billboard)	27
US Dance Airplay (Billboard)	4
US Latin Pop Airplay (Billboard)	26
US Pop Airplay (Billboard)	2
US Rhythmic Airplay (Billboard)	7

=== Year-end ===
Year-end chart performance for "We R Who We R"
Chart (2010)	Position
Australia (ARIA)	25
New Zealand (Recorded Music NZ)	50
South Korea Foreign (Circle)	45
Sweden (Sverigetopplistan)	87

Chart (2011)	Position
Australia (ARIA)	100
Belgium (Ultratop Wallonia)	90
Brazil (Crowley)	15
Canada Hot 100 (Billboard)	35
Hungary (Editors' Choice Top 40)	55
Japan Adult Contemporary (Billboard)	67
Japan Radio Songs (Billboard)	72
UK Singles (Official Charts)	57
US Billboard Hot 100	30
US Dance/Mix Show Airplay (Billboard)	36
US Pop Airplay (Billboard)	12
US Radio Songs (Billboard)	34
US Rhythmic Airplay (Billboard)	37

== Certifications and sales ==
Certifications and sales for "We R Who We R"
Region	Certification	Certified units/sales
Australia (ARIA)	5× Platinum	350,000^{‡}
Germany (BVMI)	Gold	150,000^{‡}
Italy (FIMI)	Gold	15,000^{*}
Mexico (AMPROFON)	Gold	30,000^{*}
New Zealand (RMNZ)	2× Platinum	60,000^{‡}
South Korea	—	269,601
Sweden (GLF)	Platinum	40,000^{‡}
United Kingdom (BPI)	Platinum	600,000^{‡}
United States (RIAA)	6× Platinum	6,000,000^{‡}
^{*} Sales figures based on certification alone.^{‡} Sales+streaming figures based on certification alone.

== Release history ==
Release dates for "We R Who We R"
Region	Date	Format	Label	Ref.
Australia	October 22, 2010	Digital download	RCA	
Austria	October 22, 2010	Digital download	RCA	
Belgium	October 22, 2010	Digital download	RCA	
Canada	October 22, 2010	Digital download	RCA	
Germany	October 22, 2010	Digital download	RCA	
Ireland	October 22, 2010	Digital download	RCA	
Italy	October 22, 2010	Digital download	RCA	
Netherlands	October 22, 2010	Digital download	RCA	
New Zealand	October 22, 2010	Digital download	RCA	
Sweden	October 22, 2010	Digital download	RCA	
Switzerland	October 22, 2010	Digital download	RCA	
United States	October 22, 2010	Digital download	RCA	
United States	October 25, 2010	Rhythmic contemporary radio	RCA	
South Korea	October 26, 2010	Digital download	Sony	
United States	October 26, 2010	Contemporary hit radio	RCA	
Germany	January 7, 2011	CD	RCA	
United Kingdom	January 16, 2011	Digital download	RCA	

== See also ==
- List of number-one singles of 2010 (Australia)
- List of UK Singles Chart number ones of the 2010s
- List of Billboard Hot 100 number ones of 2010
