= Joyride (Kesha song) =

2024 single by Kesha

Single by Kesha

from the album Period
- Released: July 4, 2024
- Genre: Electropop; dance-pop; synth-pop; EDM; polka
- Length: 2:30
- Label: Kesha
- Songwriters: Kesha Sebert; Madison Love; Kevin Hickey
- Producers: Kesha; Zhone

Kesha singles chronology
"Only Love Can Save Us Now" (2023)	"Joyride" (2024)	"Delusional" (2024)

Music video
- "Joyride" on YouTube

"Joyride" (stylized "JOYRIDE.") is a song by American singer and songwriter Kesha. It was released on July 4, 2024, by her own self-titled record label as the lead single from her sixth studio album, Period (2025). An official lyric video was released on the same day. The song marks Kesha's first release since departing from RCA and Kemosabe Records. Kesha wrote the single with Madison Love and Zhone, and produced it with the latter.

"Joyride" debuted at number 88 on the UK Singles Chart, while also debuting at number 83 on the Irish Singles Chart. The song also reached number six on the US Billboard Bubbling Under Hot 100, and number 27 on Billboard Pop Airplay chart, becoming her first top-40 entry on the latter since "Raising Hell" in 2019, and eighteenth overall. As of July 2026, "Joyride" has amassed over 150 million streams on Spotify.

== Background and release ==
From 2014 to 2023, Kesha had been embroiled in a legal battle with her former producer, Dr. Luke. She had originally sued him for sexual assault and battery, then he countersued for defamation. The lawsuit halted Kesha's career for a few years and she had filed a preliminary injunction in 2016 to be released from her contract with RCA Records and Kemosabe Records which she signed when she was 18. She was denied the injunction and has since released three more albums under the label. Her fifth and final album under the labels, Gag Order, was released in May 2023. Her lawsuit was set to go to trial in July 2023, but a settlement was reached a month before the trial date, thus ending the near decade long suit. In December 2023, it was officially reported that Kesha had parted ways with both RCA and Kemosabe, as well as her management team, Vector Management. "In need of a fresh start in my life, we have parted ways, but I will remain forever grateful for the run we had," Kesha said in a statement to Variety. She signed with a new management team, Crush Music in late February 2024. In an interview with V Magazine, Kesha had hinted about music saying there is a day marked when she is free to release music.

Kesha announced the single on June 29, 2024 with a teaser video. She initially teased a lyric, "GET IN LOSER" with a photo on social media teasing the song's title and release date. The singer was seen sporting red vinyl and sheer looks. The single was released by Kesha's self-titled label, Kesha Records published through Warner Chappell Music and distributed by Alternative Distribution Alliance. The song marks Kesha's first release since departing from RCA and Kemosabe Records, as well as her first release as an independent artist. Kesha unveiled the song four days before its release in Brooklyn at Planet Pride. According to Kesha, the song was written and recorded within two hours.

== Composition ==
"Joyride" runs a total of two minutes and thirty seconds, and has been described as electropop, dance-pop, synth-pop, EDM and polka. The song has hyperpop and polka influences utilizing accordions, heavy synths, and modulated vocals. The song sees the return of Kesha's "talk-singing" style, reminiscent of her earlier works. Lyrically, Kesha uses metaphors comparing driving cars to self-love and self-empowerment. Nylon described the lyrics as "tongue-in–cheek...[and] represent[s] Kesha’s humor and pop-cultural savvy, crucial skills for a 21st-century songwriter."

== Critical reception ==
"Joyride" received positive reviews from critics and publications. Zoe Guy of Vulture found the song a "banger" that is perfectly in sync with summer. Tomás Mier of Rolling Stone called it "delightfully campy" with a taste of a "carefree Kesha summer". Variety echoed Guy's sentiments, describing the song as an "electro-banger" perfectly timed for the summer, as well as a callback to her earlier hits such as "Tik Tok" and "We R Who We R". Robin Murray of Clash gave the song an 8 out of 10, describing it as a vibrant and energetic track that embodies Kesha's signature style. He noted that the track "breaks free of the rules" and builds to a powerful climax, emphasizing Kesha's focus on joy over expectations.

=== Accolades ===
Critics' year-end rankings of "Joyride"
Publication	List	Rank	Ref.
Billboard	The 100 Best Songs of 2024	77	
Exclaim!	20 Best Songs of 2024	8	
Rolling Stone	100 Best Songs of 2024	72	

== Music video ==
Kesha teased the song's music video on November 19, 2024, announcing its release date for the following day. The video was written and directed by Laura Gorun, Dimitri Basil, and Couper Roussel, with Kesha contributing as a co-director. The video pays homage to Quentin Tarantino's film series, Kill Bill, with the singer wearing a red leather hell-raiser on the run from a group of assassins. The video starts off with Kesha leaving prison, with the radio announcer reporting her release after nine years, referring to her work relationship with Dr. Luke. She then finds out that her unnamed tormentor has "60 miles of blacktop" to catch her, which is dubbed in Italian. Throughout the chase, each of the names of the assassins pop up on the screen as they pursue Kesha in the desert. At the end of the video, a link to pre-save her next single, "Delusional", shows up during the credits.

The video stars Marc Hertle as Yippie & the Kiyays, Anna Malygon as Sadie the Stabber & the Crazyboys, Neil Stephens as Rowdy Ricky & the Red Flags, and Mike O'Hearn as Derk Delusional the One to Outrun.

== Track listing ==
Digital download and streaming

1. "Joyride" – 2:30

Digital download and streaming – EP

1. "Joyride" – 2:30
2. "Joyride" (radio edit) – 2:30
3. "Joyride" (instrumental) – 2:28
4. "Joyride" (acapella) – 2:22

Digital download and streaming (remixes)

1. "Joyride" – 2:30
2. "Joyride" (radio edit) – 2:30
3. "Joyride" (extended) – 4:25
4. "Joyride" (Revved Up remix) – 2:04
5. "Joyride" (slowed) – 2:59
6. "Joyride" (sped up) – 2:08
7. "Joyride" (instrumental) – 2:28
8. "Joyride" (acapella) – 2:22

7-inch vinyl

1. "Joyride" – 2:30
2. "Joyride" (instrumental) – 2:28

== Charts ==
=== Weekly charts ===
Weekly chart performance for "Joyride"
Chart (2024–2025)	Peak position
Ireland (IRMA)	83
Lithuania Airplay (TopHit)	91
New Zealand Hot 40 Singles (RMNZ)	17
UK Singles (Official Charts)	88
US Bubbling Under Hot 100 (Billboard)	6
US Hot Dance/Electronic Songs (Billboard)	6
US Hot Dance/Pop Songs (Billboard)	10
US Pop Airplay (Billboard)	27

=== Year-end charts ===
2024 year-end chart performance for "Joyride"
Chart (2024)	Position
US Hot Dance/Electronic Songs (Billboard)	24

== Release history ==
"Joyride" release history
Region	Date	Formats	Version(s)	Label	Ref.
Various	July 4, 2024	Digital download; streaming	Original	Kesha	
Various	July 19, 2024	Digital download; streaming	EP	Kesha	
Various	August 2, 2024	Digital download; streaming	Remixes	Kesha	
United States	August 20, 2024	Contemporary hit radio	Original	Kesha	
Various	November 11, 2024	7-inch vinyl	Original; instrumental	Kesha	
