= Yippee-Ki-Yay =

2025 single by Kesha featuring T-Pain

Single by Kesha featuring T-Pain

from the album Period
- Released: March 27, 2025
- Genre: Country pop; hip-hop
- Length: 3:32; 2:38 (solo version)
- Label: Kesha
- Songwriters: Kesha Sebert; Kyle Buckley; Brittany "Chi" Coney; Denisia "Blu June" Andrews; Ryan Jillian Santiago; Poutyface; Faheem Najm
- Producers: Pink Slip; Nova Wav

Kesha singles chronology
"Dear Me" (2025)	"Yippee-Ki-Yay" (2025)	"Sugar Free Venom" (2025)

T-Pain singles chronology
"Get Low" (2024)	"Yippee-Ki-Yay" (2025)	"Gripper" (2025)

Lyric video
- "Yippee-Ki-Yay" on YouTube

"Yippee-Ki-Yay" is a song by American singer and songwriter Kesha featuring American singer and songwriter T-Pain. It was released on March 27, 2025, by her own self-titled record label as the third single from her sixth studio album, Period (2025).

== Background ==
On March 24, 2025, Kesha announced "Yippee-Ki-Yay" as the third single from Period (2025). The song was released with the pre-order for the album, and impacted US radio stations on April 16, 2025. The song was produced by Pink Slip and Nova Wav. She appeared at weekend two of Coachella as a special guest of A. G. Cook where she performed an unreleased remix of the song with him.

== Composition ==
The song is a twangy hip hop and country pop track that drew comparisons to Shaboozey's "A Bar Song (Tipsy)". The song fuses acoustic guitar, percussion and clap snares as Kesha sings about spending time with friends around a bonfire.

== Critical reception ==
Paste listed it as one of the worst songs of 2025.

== Track listing ==
Digital download and streaming

1. "Yippee-Ki-Yay" (featuring T-Pain) – 3:32
2. "Yippee-Ki-Yay" – 2:37

Digital download and streaming

1. "Yippee-Ki-Yay" (featuring T-Pain; A. G. Cook remix) – 3:51
2. "Yippee-Ki-Yay" (The Hosed Down remix) – 1:59
3. "Yippee-Ki-Yay" (featuring T-Pain) – 3:32

== Charts ==
Chart performance for "Yippee-Ki-Yay"
Chart (2025)	Peak position
US Digital Song Sales (Billboard)	13

== Release history ==
"Yippee-Ki-Yay" release history
Region	Date	Format(s)	Version(s)	Label	Ref.
Various	March 27, 2025	Digital download; streaming	Original; solo	Kesha	
Italy	March 31, 2025	Radio airplay	Original	Ada	
United States	April 16, 2025	Contemporary hit radio	Original	Kesha	
Various	May 9, 2025	Digital download; streaming	Remixes	Kesha	
