= Delusional (Kesha song) =

2024 single by Kesha

- 2025 cover

Single by Kesha

from the album Period
- Released: November 29, 2024
- Genre: Pop
- Length: 3:34; 3:15 (edit)
- Label: Kesha
- Songwriters: Kesha Sebert; Madison Love; Zhone
- Producers: Kesha; Zhone

Kesha singles chronology
"Joyride" (2024)	"Delusional" (2024)	"Dear Me" (2025)

Original cover

Audio video
- "Delusional" on YouTube

"Delusional" is a song by American singer and songwriter Kesha. It was released on November 29, 2024, by her own self-titled record label as the second single from her sixth studio album, Period (2025). The single was written and produced by Kesha, Zhone, and co-written with Madison Love.

== Background and release ==
Kesha had teased a snippet of the song on her social media on September 20, 2024. On November 20, Kesha released the official music video for her single, "Joyride". As the video ends, a pre-save link pops up on screen for the next single for her upcoming sixth studio album.

== Composition ==
"Delusional" is an "emotionally charged" pop power ballad, showcasing Kesha's vulnerability and runs three minutes and fifteen seconds. Lyrically, the song sees the singer confronting an ex who seems unable to face up to reality.

== Artwork ==
The original artwork features a pile of leather bags with the song's title spray-painted on each bag, with some prominent misspellings of "delusional" on several of them. The use of generative artificial intelligence for the single's artwork was criticized. Kesha did not initially address the backlash. On May 20, 2025, she changed the artwork to a photograph of her sitting on a chair and laughing. She described it as "one of [her] favorites" and thanked her "incredible team of humans" for helping her create it. She explained that she had initially used AI to make a point about how artists are undervalued, but later came to the conclusion that "living in alignment with [her] integrity is more important than proving a point." She further stated her belief that AI should be used "as a tool and not as a replacement".

== Track listing ==
Digital download and streaming

1. "Delusional" (edit) – 3:15
2. "Delusional" – 3:34
3. "Joyride" – 2:30

Digital download and streaming (remix)

1. "Delusional" (Armin van Buuren remix) – 2:54
2. "Delusional" (Armin van Buuren extended remix) – 4:51
3. "Delusional" – 3:34

== Charts ==
Chart performance
Chart (2024)	Peak position
New Zealand Hot Singles (RMNZ)	27
