= List of awards and nominations received by Kesha =

Kesha awards and nominations
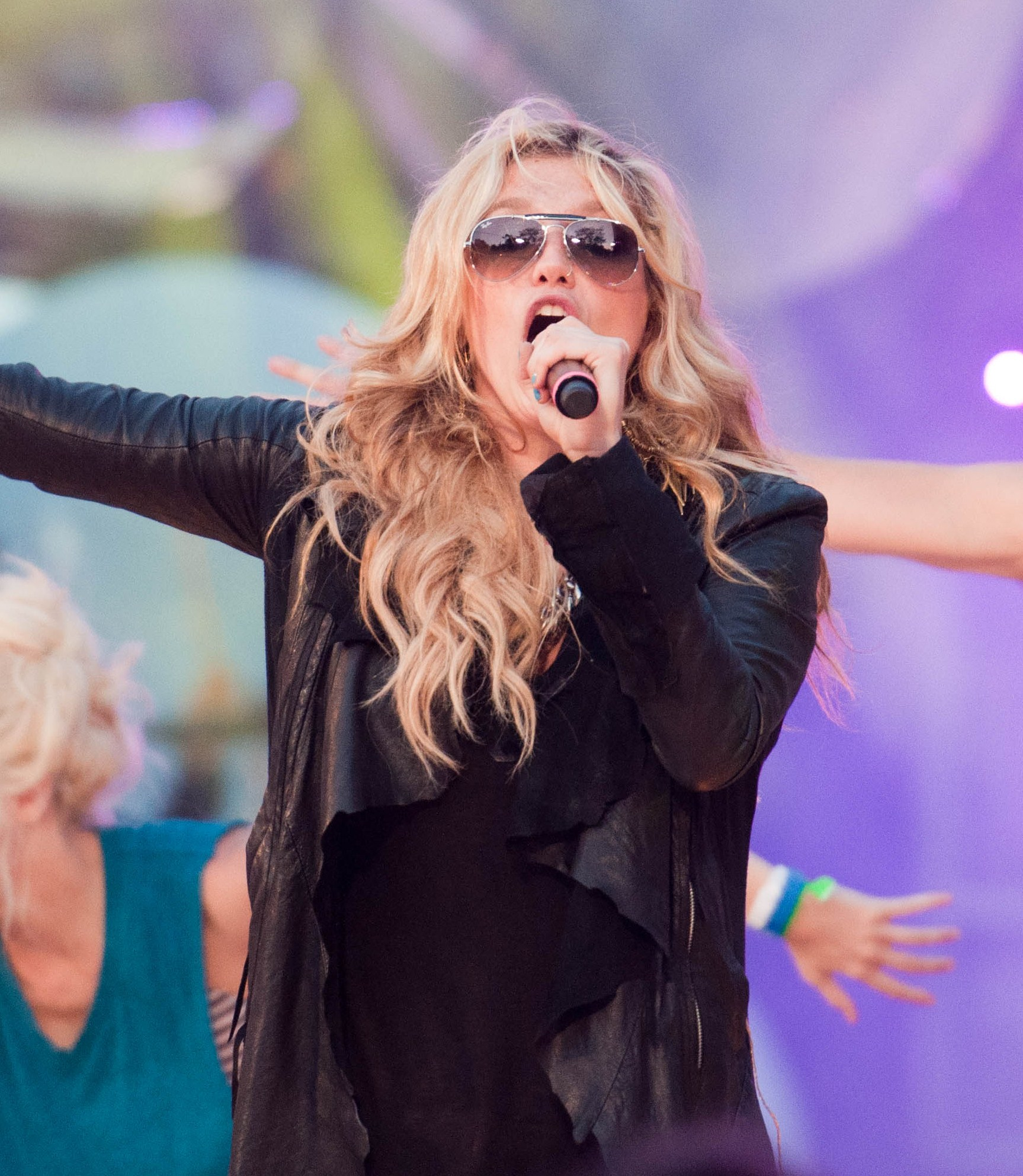
- Kesha performing at the 2010 MuchMusic Video Awards
Awards and nominations
Award	Wins	Nominations
American Music Awards	0	3
ASCAP Pop Music Awards	2	2
ARIA Music Awards	0	1
Billboard Music Awards	0	8
Billboard Women in Music	1	1
BMI Pop Awards	7	7
Bravo Otto Awards	1	1
British LGBT Awards	0	1
The Center	1	1
Clio Awards	2	2
ECHO Music Awards	0	1
Eska Music Awards	1	1
The Flecking Awards	1	6
Genesis Awards	1	1
GLAAD Media Awards	0	1
Glamour Woman of the Year	1	1
Grammy Awards	0	2
iHeartRadio Music Awards	1	2
Hollywood Music in Media Awards	1	2
HRC Equality Gala	1	1
International Dance Music Awards	0	1
Japan Gold Disc Awards	2	3
Juno Awards	0	1
Libera Awards	0	1
MTV Video Music Awards	0	5
MTV Europe Music Awards	1	3
MuchMusic Video Awards	0	4
MVPA Awards	0	1
NewNowNext Awards	1	2
NRJ Music Awards	0	1
Nickelodeon Australian Kids' Choice Awards	0	1
NME Awards	0	1
People's Choice Awards	0	1
PETA Libby Awards	1	2
Premios 40 Principales	0	2
Teen Choice Awards	0	7
To The Rescue! Gala	1	1
Webby Awards	2	2
World Music Awards	0	9

Totals (Note: Certain award groups do not simply award one winner. They acknowledge several different recipients, have runners-up, and have third place. Since this is a specific recognition and is different from losing an award, runner-up mentions are considered wins in this award tally. For simplification and to avoid errors, each award in this list has been presumed to have had a prior nomination.)
- Wins: 31
- Nominations: 102

American singer-songwriter Kesha has been nominated for seven Billboard Music Awards, two Grammy Awards, one Academy Award, three American Music Awards, five MTV Video Music Awards, and three MTV Europe Music Awards, winning the award for MTV Europe Music Award for Best New Act in 2010. The singer has also been honored with the Gretchen Wyler Genesis Award, the Human Rights Campaign's Visibility Award, the Billboard Women in Music Trailblazer Award, the Humane Society of the United States' Voice for the Animals Award, and the Visionary Award at the New York City LGBT Center annual dinner.

== AMFT Awards ==
Year	Nominee / work	Award	Result	Ref.
2017	"Praying"	Best Pop Solo Performance	Won	

== ARIA Music Awards ==
The ARIA Music Awards are presented annually by the Australian Recording Industry Association to recognize achievements in the Australian music industry.

Year	Nominee / work	Award	Result
2011	Herself	Best International Artist	Nominated

== ASCAP Pop Music Awards ==
The annual ASCAP Pop Music Awards honors the songwriters and publishers of the most performed pop songs.

Year	Nominee / work	Award	Result
2011	"Tik Tok"	Most Performed Song	Won
2019	"Good Old Days"	Most Performed Song	Won

== American Music Awards ==
The American Music Awards is an annual major American music award show by the American Broadcasting Company. It was established in 1973. Kesha has been nominated for 3 awards.

Year	Nominee / work	Award	Result
2010	Herself	Artist of the Year	Nominated
2010	Herself	Favorite Pop/Rock Female Artist	Nominated
2010	Herself	T-Mobile Breakthrough Artist	Nominated

== Billboard ==
=== Billboard Music Awards ===
The Billboard Music Award is an honor given by Billboard, a publication and music popularity chart covering the music business of the previous year.

Year	Nominee / work	Award	Result
2011	Herself	Top New Artist	Nominated
2011	Herself	Top Female Artist	Nominated
2011	Herself	Top Pop Artist	Nominated
2011	Herself	Top Hot 100 Artist	Nominated
2011	Herself	Top Digital Songs Artist	Nominated
2011	Animal	Top Pop Album	Nominated
2014	"Timber" (with Pitbull)	Top Rap Song	Nominated

=== Billboard Women in Music ===
Established in 2007, Billboard Women in Music recognizes influential female artists and music executives who have made significant contributions to the business and who, through their work and continued success, inspire generations of women to take on increasing responsibilities within the field.

Year	Nominee / work	Award	Result	Ref.
2016	Herself	Trailblazer Award	Won	

== Bravo Otto ==
Bravo Otto is a German accolade honoring excellence of performers in film, television and music. Kesha has won one award.

Year	Nominee / work	Award	Result
2010	Herself	Best Female Singer	Won

== British LGBT Awards ==
The British LGBT Awards celebrate the UK's most loved LGBT personalities, innovators and companies, dubbed the "Gay Oscars" by the press. Kesha has received one nomination.

Year	Nominee / work	Award	Result
2019	Herself	Music Artist	Nominated

== BMI Pop Awards ==
Broadcast Music, Inc. (BMI) is one of three United States performing rights organizations, along with ASCAP and SESAC. It collects license fees on behalf of songwriters, composers, and music publishers and distributes them as royalties to those members whose works have been performed.

Year	Nominee / work	Award	Result
2011	"Tik Tok"	Award-Winning Songs	Won
2011	"Your Love Is My Drug"	Award-Winning Songs	Won
2012	"Blow"	Award-Winning Songs	Won
2012	"We R Who We R"	Award-Winning Songs	Won
2012	"Till The World Ends"	Award-Winning Songs	Won
2019	"Praying"	Award-Winning Songs	Won
2019	"Good Old Days"	Award-Winning Songs	Won

== The Center ==
The Lesbian, Gay, Bisexual & Transgender Community Center, commonly called The Center, is a nonprofit organization serving the lesbian, gay, bisexual and transgender (LGBTQ) population of New York City and nearby communities. Each year the Center hold an annual dinner to celebrate the Center's continued service to the local and global queer community.

=== The Center Dinner ===
Year	Nominee / work	Award	Result
2025	Herself	Visionary Award	Won

== Clio Awards ==
The Clio Awards is an annual award program that recognizes innovation and creativity in advertising, design and communication.

Year	Nominee / work	Award	Result	Ref.
2019	Rainbow: The Film	Music Marketing: Five Minutes and Over (Silver)	Won	

=== Clio Cannabis Awards ===
The Clio Cannabis Awards celebrates creators at the forefront of cannabis creative, marketing, and communications.

Year	Nominee / work	Award	Result	Ref.
2022	"Taste So Good"	Integrated Campaign (Gold)	Won	
2022	"Taste So Good"	Partnerships & Collaborations	Won	

== ECHO Awards ==
The ECHO Award is a German music award granted every year by the Deutsche Phono-Akademie, an association of recording companies.

Year	Nominee / work	Award	Result
2011	Herself	Best International Newcomer	Nominated

== Eska Music Awards ==
The Eska Music Awards is a major Polish awards ceremony for national and international music launched in 2002 by Radio Eska. The ceremony is held in Łódź, Poland and takes place in April every following year.

Year	Nominee / work	Award	Result
2010	Herself	Best New Artist	Won

== The Flecking Awards ==
Year	Nominee / work	Award	Result
2011	Herself	Most Annoying	Nominated
2011	Herself	The Star You Love to Hate	Nominated
2011	Herself	Put Some Clothes On!	Nominated
2011	Herself	Best Female Musician	Nominated
2011	"We R Who We R"	Best Single	Nominated
2012	Herself	Female Twitterer Of The Year	Second

== GAFFA Awards ==
The GAFFA Awards (Danish: GAFFA Prisen) have been awarded since 1991 by Danish magazine of the same name in the field of popular music.

Year	Nominee / work	Award	Result
2021	Herself	Best International Solo Act	Nominated
2021	High Road	Best International Album	Nominated

== GLAAD Media Awards ==
The GLAAD Media Awards were created in 1990 by the Gay & Lesbian Alliance Against Defamation to "recognize and honor media for their fair, accurate and inclusive representations of the LGBT community and the issues that affect their lives."

Year	Nominee / work	Award	Result
2018	Rainbow	Outstanding Music Artist	Nominated

== Glamour ==
The Glamour Awards is an annual set of awards hosted by Glamour magazine.

=== Glamour Women of the Year Awards ===
Woman of the Year awards honour "extraordinary and inspirational" women from a variety of fields, including entertainment, business, sports, music, science, medicine, education and politics.

Year	Nominee / work	Award	Result
2024	Herself	Music Icon	Won

== Grammy Awards ==
The Grammy Awards are awarded annually by the National Academy of Recording Arts and Sciences of the United States for outstanding achievements in the music industry. Often considered the highest music honor, the awards were established in 1958.

Year	Nominee / work	Award	Result
2018	Rainbow	Best Pop Vocal Album	Nominated
2018	"Praying"	Best Pop Solo Performance	Nominated

== HRC Equality Gala ==
The Human Rights Campaign Fund was founded by Steve Endean in 1980 as one of the first gay and lesbian political action committee in the United States. HRC's Visibility Award recognizes the outstanding efforts of those who use their incredible talent and visibility to help better the lives of LGBT people.

Year	Nominee / work	Award	Result	Ref.
2016	Herself	Visibility Award	Won	

== Humane Society of the United States ==
=== Genesis Awards ===
The Genesis Awards are awarded annually by the Humane Society of the United States to individuals in the major news and entertainment media for producing outstanding works which raise public awareness of animal issues. Presented by the HSUS Hollywood Outreach program, the awards show takes place every March in California.

Year	Nominee / work	Award	Result	Ref.
2013	Herself	The Gretchen Wyler Award	Won	

=== To The Rescue! Gala ===
The Humane Society of the United States' 2019 To The Rescue! Los Angeles Gala was held on May 4, 2019.

Year	Nominee / work	Award	Result
2019	Herself	Voice for the Animals	Won

== iHeartRadio Music Awards ==
The iHeartRadio Music Award was founded by iHeartRadio in 2014. The event is broadcast live on NBC. Awards were presented to the world's best-selling artists in the various categories and to the best-selling artists from each major territory.

Year	Nominee / work	Award	Result
2014	"Timber" (with Pitbull)	Best Collaboration	Won
2019	"Here Comes The Change"	Song That Left Us Shook	Nominated

== Hollywood Music in Media Awards ==
The Hollywood Music in Media Awards (HMMA) honors music in film, television, video games, commercials, and trailers.

Year	Nominee / work	Award	Result
2018	"Here Comes The Change"	Best Original Song - Feature Film	Nominated
2025	"Dear Me"	Best Original Song - Documentary Film	Won

== International Dance Music Awards ==
The International Dance Music Award was established in 1985. It is a part of the Winter Music Conference, a weeklong electronic music event held annually.

Year	Nominee / work	Award	Result
2011	"Your Love Is My Drug"	Best Pop Dance Track	Nominated

== Japan Gold Disc Awards ==
The Japan Gold Disc Awards are an annual ceremony hosted in Japan. The winner are based by sales provided by The Recording Industry Association of Japan.

Year	Nominee / work	Award	Result
2011	Herself	International Artist of The Year	Nominated
2011	Herself	International New Artist of The Year	Won
2011	Herself	Three Best New Artists	Won

== Juno Awards ==
The Juno Awards are presented annually to Canadian musical artists and bands to acknowledge their artistic and technical achievements in all aspects of music. New members of the Canadian Music Hall of Fame are also inducted as part of the awards ceremonies.mWinners are currently chosen by either members of the Canadian Academy of Recording Arts and Sciences or a panel of experts depending on the award. In almost all of the main general categories, nominees are determined by sales during the qualifying period; in genre-specific categories, they are determined by panel.

Year	Nominee / work	Award	Result
2011	Animal	International Album of the Year	Nominated

== Libera Awards ==
The Libera Awards are an annual awards ceremony organized by the American Association of Independent Music (A2IM). The awards celebrate the independent music community.

Year	Nominee / work	Award	Result
2025	"Joyride"	Best Pop Record	Pending

== MTV Awards ==
=== MTV Video Music Awards ===
The MTV Video Music Awards is an annual awards ceremony established in 1984 by MTV.

Year	Nominee / work	Award	Result
2010	Herself	Best New Artist	Nominated
2010	"Tik Tok"	Best Female Video	Nominated
2010	"Tik Tok"	Best Pop Video	Nominated
2010	"My First Kiss" (with 3OH!3)	Best Collaboration	Nominated
2014	"Timber" (with Pitbull)	Best Collaboration	Nominated

=== MTV Europe Music Awards ===
The MTV Europe Music Awards (EMA) were established in 1994 by MTV Networks Europe to celebrate the most popular music videos in Europe.

Year	Nominee / work	Award	Result
2010	Herself	Best New Act	Won
2010	Herself	Best Push Act	Nominated
2012	Herself	Best World Stage Performance	Nominated

=== MTV Italian Music Awards ===
The MTV Italian Music Awards, also known as TRL (Total Request Live) Awards, are hosted annually in Italy by MTV. They award the best video, performers, and artists of the year.

Year	Nominee / work	Award	Result
2010	Herself	Best Look	Nominated
2011	Herself	Wonder Woman Award	Nominated
2013	Herself	Wonder Woman Award	Nominated

=== MTV Video Music Brazil ===
The MTV Video Music Brazil, commonly known as VMB, was MTV Brazil's annual award ceremony, established in 1995. In 2013, due to the devolution of the brand MTV to Viacom, and with the reformulation of the channel, the ceremony was discontinued.

Year	Nominee / work	Award	Result
2010	Herself	Best International Act	Nominated

== MVPA Awards ==
The MVPA Awards are annually presented by a Los Angeles-based music trade organization to honor the year's best music videos.

Year	Nominee / work	Award	Result
2012	"Blow"	Best Direction of a Female Artist	Nominated

== MuchMusic Video Awards ==
The MuchMusic Video Awards (also known as (the) MMVA or MMVAs) are annual awards presented by the Canadian music video channel MuchMusic to honor the year's best music videos.

Year	Nominee / work	Award	Result
2010	"Tik Tok"	International Video of the Year – Artist	Nominated
2010	"Tik Tok"	UR FAVE: International Video	Nominated
2011	"Take It Off"	MuchMUSIC.COM Most Watched Video	Nominated
2011	"Your Love Is My Drug"	MuchMUSIC.COM Most Watched Video	Nominated

== m-v-f- Awards ==
Music Video Festival (m-v-f) is a Brazilian platform that celebrates and showcases music videos and highlight its importance and influence on popular culture, creative expression, technology and new content distribution formats, created in 2013.

The m-v-f- Awards is the competitive segment of m-v-f- that annually recognizes and awards the best national and international music videos, since 2013.

Year	Nominee / work	Award	Result	Ref.
2024	"Eat the Acid"	International Visualizer	Won	

== NRJ Music Awards ==
The NRJ Music Awards is a major music ceremony in France, held annually by the radio station NRJ in partnership with the television network TF1.

Year	Nominee / work	Award	Result
2011	Herself	International Breakthrough of the Year	Nominated

== NewNowNext Awards ==
The NewNowNext Awards is an American annual entertainment awards show, presented by the lesbian, gay, bisexual and transgender-themed channel Logo. Launched in 2008, awards are presented both for LGBT-specific and general interest achievements in entertainment and pop culture.

Year	Nominee / work	Award	Result
2010	Herself	Best New Indulgence	Nominated
2013	"C'Mon"	That's My Jam	Won

== Nickelodeon Australian Kids' Choice Awards ==
The Nickelodeon Australian Kids' Choice Awards honor entertainers with a blimp trophy, as voted by children.

Year	Nominee / work	Award	Result
2010	"Tik Tok"	Fave Song	Nominated

== NME Awards ==
The NME Awards is an annual music awards show in the United Kingdom, founded by the music magazine, NME (New Musical Express). Though the accolades given are entirely genuine, the ceremony itself is usually carried out in a humorous and jovial manner, and have included categories in the past like "Villain of the year" and "Worst Record". The trophies given to the winners resemble an extended middle finger.

Year	Nominee / work	Award	Result
2011	Herself	Least Stylish	Nominated

== People's Choice Awards ==
The People's Choice Awards are a venue for the American public to honor their favorite actors and actresses, musical performers, television shows, and motion pictures. It is fans who voted.

Year	Nominee / work	Award	Result
2010	Herself	Favorite Breakout Artist	Nominated

== PETA Libby Awards ==
The Libby Awards is an annual awards ceremony organized by PETA's youth arm peta2.

Year	Nominee / work	Award	Result
2012	Herself	Most Animal Friendly Pop/Hip-Hop Artist	Won
2012	Herself	Best peta2 Ad	Nominated

== Premios 40 Principales ==
Los Premios 40 Principales were created in 2006 by Spanish music radio station Los 40 Principales to celebrate its 40th anniversary.

Year	Nominee / work	Award	Result
2010	Herself	Best International Artist	Nominated
2010	"Tik Tok"	Best International Song	Nominated

== Teen Choice Awards ==
The Teen Choice Awards is an annual fan voted awards show established in 1999 by the Fox Broadcasting Company.

Year	Nominee / work	Award	Result
2010	Herself	Choice Music: Female Artist	Nominated
2010	Herself	Choice Music: Breakout Artist – Female	Nominated
2010	Herself	Choice Summer Music Star: Female	Nominated
2010	Animal	Choice Music: Album – Pop	Nominated
2010	"Your Love Is My Drug"	Choice Music: Single	Nominated
2010	"Your Love Is My Drug"	Choice Summer Music: Single	Nominated
2016	Herself	Choice Style: Female	Nominated

== Webby Awards ==
The Webby Awards is an award for excellence on the Internet presented annually by The International Academy of Digital Arts and Sciences.

Year	Nominee / work	Award	Result
2019	"I Need a Woman to Love"	Best Editing	Won
2019	Rainbow The Film	Best Online Music Film	Won

== World Music Awards ==
The World Music Award is an international awards show founded in 1989 that annually honors recording artists based on worldwide sales figures provided by the International Federation of the Phonographic Industry (IFPI).

Year	Nominee / work	Award	Result
2010	Herself	World's Best New Artist	Nominated
2014	Herself	World's Best Female Artist	Nominated
2014	Herself	World's Best Live Act	Nominated
2014	Herself	World's Best Entertainer of the Year	Nominated
2014	"Crazy Kids" (with will.i.am)	World's Best Song	Nominated
2014	"Crazy Kids" (with will.i.am)	World's Best Video	Nominated
2014	"Die Young"	World's Best Video	Nominated
2014	"Die Young"	World's Best Song	Nominated
2014	Warrior	World's Best Album	Nominated

== Žebřík Music Awards ==
Year	Nominee / work	Award	Result	Ref.
2010	Herself	Best International Discovery	Nominated	
