= Kesha =

American singer and rapper (born 1987)

- Kesha in 2026
- Born: Kesha Rose Sebert; March 1, 1987 (age 39); Los Angeles, California, U.S.
- Other name: Ke$ha
- Occupations: Singer; songwriter; rapper
- Years active: 2005–present
- Works: Discography; songs; videography
- Mother: Pebe Sebert
- Awards: Full list
- Musical career
- Genres: Pop; electronic; dance; hip-hop
- Instruments: Vocals; guitar; keyboards
- Labels: Kemosabe; RCA; Kesha
- Website: keshaofficial.com

Signature
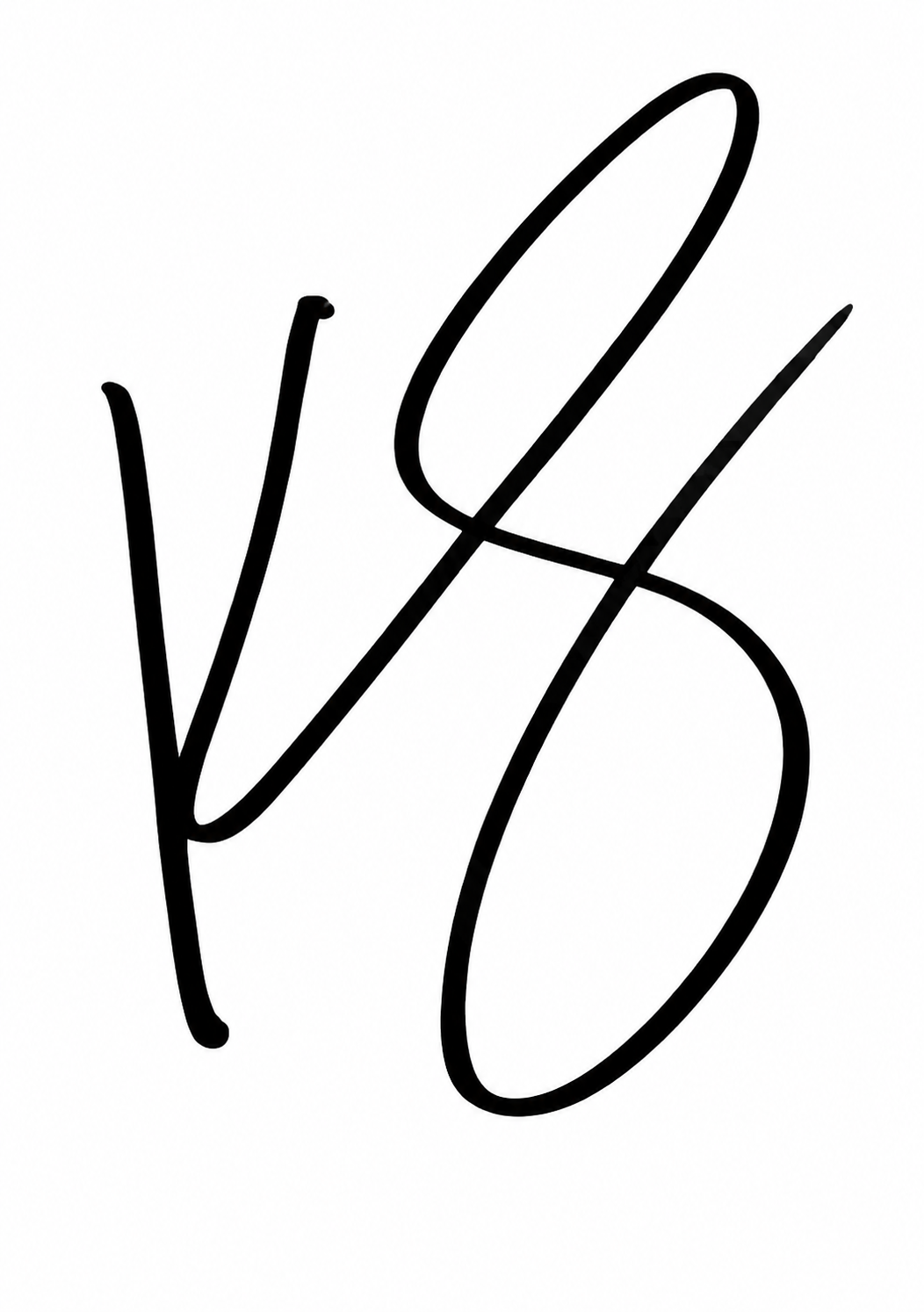

Kesha Rose Sebert (Note: /ˈkɛʃə ˈsiːbərt/ KESH-ə SEE-bərt) (born March 1, 1987), stylized as Ke$ha until 2014, is an American singer, songwriter, and rapper. She has attained two number-one albums on the US Billboard 200 to date, with Animal (2010) and Rainbow (2017), and the top-ten records Warrior (2012) and High Road (2020). She has also attained ten top-ten singles and three number ones on the US Billboard Hot 100, including "Tik Tok", "We R Who We R", "Timber" with Pitbull, "Die Young", "Till The World Ends" (the Femme Fatale remix) with Nicki Minaj and Britney Spears, "Your Love Is My Drug", "Blow", "Blah Blah Blah" and "My First Kiss" with 3OH!3 (both as a lead and featured act), and "Take It Off". Furthermore, she has an uncredited number one on the US Billboard Hot 100 with her featured appearance on American rapper Flo Rida's single "Right Round" (2009). Her debut single "Tik Tok", which released later that same year, was once the best-selling digital single in history before being surpassed in 2011. She fulfilled her five-album contract with Kemosabe Records and RCA Records by releasing her final contractual album Gag Order (2023) under both labels, and released her first independent album, Period (2025), under her own eponymous label, Kesha Records.

Kesha's career was halted in between her second and third albums, Warrior and Rainbow, due to a legal dispute with her former producer, Dr. Luke, which she had filed in 2014. A series of lawsuits, known collectively as Kesha v. Dr. Luke, were exchanged between the two parties in which Kesha accused him of physical, sexual, and emotional abuse and employment discrimination against her, while Dr. Luke claimed breach of contract and defamation. The case was settled out of court in June 2023.

Kesha has sold over 100 million records worldwide. She is listed as the 26th top artist on Billboard's 2010s decade-end charts. She has received various awards and nominations, including the MTV Europe Music Award for Best New Act in 2010. Kesha has also co-written songs for other artists, including "Till the World Ends" (2011) for Britney Spears and songs for Ariana Grande, Miley Cyrus, Miranda Cosgrove, and Girls' Generation.

== Early life ==
Kesha Rose Sebert was born on March 1, 1987, in Los Angeles. Her mother, Rosemary Patricia "Pebe" Sebert, is a singer-songwriter who co-wrote the 1978 single "Old Flames Can't Hold a Candle to You" with Hugh Moffatt for Joe Sun, made popular by country music artist Dolly Parton on her 1980 album Dolly, Dolly, Dolly. Pebe, a single mother, struggled financially while supporting herself, Kesha, and Kesha's older brother Lagan; they relied on welfare payments and food stamps to get by. When Kesha was an infant, Pebe would often have to look after her onstage while performing. Kesha says she does not know her father's identity. In 2011, a man named Bob Chamberlain who called himself her father approached Star with pictures and letters, claiming they proved that he and Kesha had been in regular contact as father and daughter before she turned 19. Her mother is mostly of Hungarian descent. One of Kesha's great-great-grandmothers was born in modern-day Poland.

Pebe moved the family to Nashville in 1991 after securing a new publishing deal for her songwriting. She frequently brought Kesha and her brothers along to recording studios and encouraged Kesha to sing after noticing Kesha doing so. Kesha attended Franklin High School and Brentwood High School, and said she did not fit in, explaining that her unconventional style (such as homemade purple velvet pants and purple hair) did not endear her to other students. She played the trumpet and later the saxophone in the school marching band, and has said she was a diligent student.

She dropped out of school at 17 after Max Martin convinced her to return to Los Angeles to pursue a music career and earned her General Educational Development (GED) after. In a 2024 interview, Kesha contradicted past statements, saying that she never earned her GED. After attaining a near-perfect score on her SAT, she was offered a scholarship to Barnard College, an affiliate college of Columbia University, but decided to pursue her music career.

In addition to taking songwriting classes, Kesha was taught how to write songs by Pebe, and they often wrote together when she returned home from high school. Kesha began recording demos, which Pebe gave to people she knew in the music business. Kesha was also in a band with Lagan. Kesha and Pebe co-wrote the song "Stephen" when Kesha was 16. Kesha then tracked down David Gamson, a producer she admired from Scritti Politti, who agreed to produce the song. Around this time, Pebe answered an advertisement from the American reality TV series The Simple Life looking for an "eccentric" family to host Paris Hilton and Nicole Richie. The episode featuring the Sebert family aired in 2005. Martin had received one of Kesha's demos from Samantha Cox, senior director of writer/publisher relations at Broadcast Music Incorporated, and was impressed. Billboard described two of the demos in a cover story, the first as "a gorgeously sung, self-penned country ballad" and the second as "a gobsmackingly awful trip-hop track" where Kesha raps ad lib for a minute after running out of lyrics. It was the latter track that attracted attention.

== Career ==
=== 2005–2009: Career beginnings ===
"I was so happy being broke. And I'm happy not being broke. It doesn't really affect me either way. I care about taking care of people that have taken care of me – that's important to me. But to be honest, I'm kind of repulsed by the gluttony and excesses of a lot of people in the limelight."

— Kesha explaining the dollar sign in her stylized name.

In 2005, at age 18, Kesha was signed to the music publishing company Prescription Songs. Kesha later sang background vocals for Paris Hilton's single, "Nothing in This World". Kesha then signed with David Sonenberg's management company, DAS Communications Inc., in 2006. DAS was tasked with obtaining a major label record deal for Kesha in a year's time in exchange for 20 percent of her music income, with her having the option of ending the relationship if they failed. She worked with several writers and producers while at the company and ended up co-writing Australian pop group the Veronicas' single "This Love" with producer Toby Gad. While furthering her career in the studio, Kesha earned her living as a waitress. While struggling to get by, she began stylizing her name as 'Ke$ha', explaining the dollar sign as an ironic gesture.

In 2008, Kesha appeared in the video for her friend Katy Perry's single "I Kissed a Girl", and sang background vocals for Britney Spears' "Lace and Leather". DAS soon attracted the attention of songwriter and A&R Kara DioGuardi, who wanted to sign Kesha to Warner Bros. Records. The deal fell through due to her existing contract with Kemosabe. Kesha parted ways with DAS and returned to Dr. Luke. Kesha would appear on rapper Flo Rida's number-one single "Right Round" in early 2009, which exposed her to some mainstream attention. According to the parties present, the collaboration happened by accident; she had simply walked into a recording session for the song and Flo Rida happened to have wanted a female voice on it. It was reported that Flo Rida liked the result so much that he recorded one more track with Kesha for his album. However, she is not credited for her feature on the United States release of "Right Round" and did not collect any money for the part. She also refused to appear in the video, explaining to men's magazine Esquire that she wanted to make a name for herself on her own terms.

=== 2009–2011: Breakthrough, Animal, and Cannibal ===
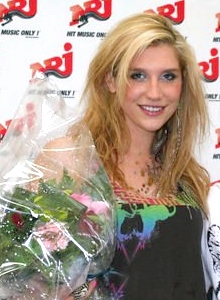
Kesha at French radio station NRJ, 2010

After failing to negotiate with Lava Records and Atlantic Records in 2009, Kesha signed a multi-album deal with RCA Records. Having spent the previous six years working on material for her debut album, she began putting finishing touches to the album. For the album, she wrote approximately 200 songs. It was certified Platinum in the United States and had sold two million albums worldwide by September of that year. The album's lead single, "Tik Tok", broke the record in the United States for the highest sales week for a single, with 610,000 digital downloads sold in a single week, the highest ever by a female artist since digital download tracking began in 2003.

It spent nine weeks at number one in the country and became the longest-running number-one by a female artist on her debut single since Debby Boone and "You Light Up My Life" in 1977. As of 2019, "Tik Tok" has sold about 14 million copies worldwide, becoming the best-selling single in digital history and the best-selling digital single in history by a female solo artist. Subsequent singles from the album ("Blah Blah Blah", "Your Love Is My Drug" and "Take It Off") achieved similar commercial success, each reaching the top ten in Australia, Canada, and the United States. Kesha was also featured on two top ten singles by musician Taio Cruz and electropop duo 3OH!3.

Kesha's deliberately unpolished aesthetic and juvenile stage persona, which she described as her own personality "times ten", quickly made her a deeply polarizing figure. Some of her critics found her output to be unsophisticated, while others felt that she was manufactured and lacked credibility. In May 2010, Kesha's former managers from DAS Communications Inc. filed a lawsuit against her, seeking $14 million from her for commissions on her RCA Records deal, alleging that she had extended the deadline for them to get her a major record label contract and squeezed them out of her career.

Kesha launched her own lawsuit in October, citing the California-exclusive Talent Agencies Act and asking the California Labor Commissioner to declare her contract with DAS void because it had acted as an unlicensed talent agent while procuring work for her in California, where only licensed agents can do so. The case was settled in 2012 before the release of her second album. Kesha held a benefit concert on June 16, 2010, where all proceeds went to aid victims of the 2010 Tennessee floods in her hometown Nashville. She raised close to $70,000 from the event. She was a supporting act on the summer North American leg of Rihanna's Last Girl on Earth and was awarded Best New Act at the 2010 MTV Europe Music Awards.

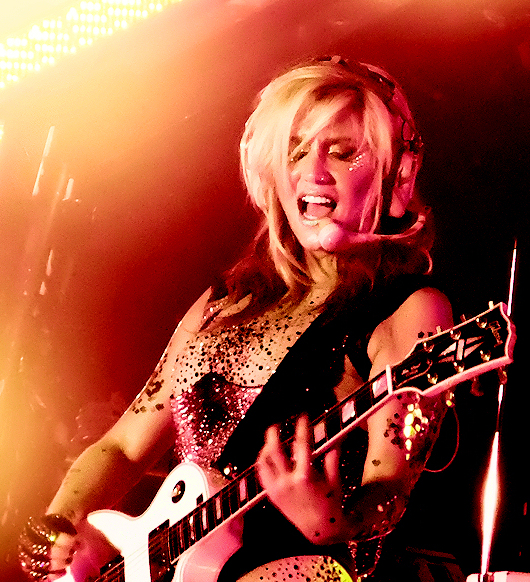
Kesha performing live during the Get Sleazy Tour, her first headlining tour, 2011

In November 2010, Animal was re-released with a companion extended play, Cannibal. The lead single taken from Cannibal, "We R Who We R", debuted at the top of the Billboard Hot 100 chart in the United States. With two number ones and four top ten hits (among them her featured spot on 3OH!3's "My First Kiss") Kesha was named Hot 100 Artist of 2010 by Billboard magazine, with "Tik Tok" ranked as the best-performing song of the year in the US. The follow-up single from Cannibal, "Blow", also charted in the top ten on the Hot 100. By June 2011, Kesha had sold almost 21 million digital single downloads in the United States alone.

In February 2011, Kesha embarked on her first headlining world tour, the Get Sleazy Tour. The tour was expanded with a summer leg due to the first leg selling out and spanned three continents. Kesha co-wrote the song "Till the World Ends" for American popstar Britney Spears and was featured on the remix of the song along with rapper Nicki Minaj. After meeting Kesha at the 2010 Grammy Awards and guesting at a number of her concerts, rock singer Alice Cooper asked her to write lyrics for and vocally perform as a devil character on their duet track, "What Baby Wants", on Cooper's album Welcome 2 My Nightmare (2011).

Kesha was named rights group Humane Society of the United States's first global ambassador for animal rights, for which she is expected to bring attention to such practices as cosmetics testing on animals and shark finning. Kesha received the Wyler Award presented by The Humane Society as a celebrity or public figure who increases awareness of animal issues via the media. She received the award March 23, 2013, at The 2013 Genesis Awards Benefit Gala. She appeared alongside rock singer Iggy Pop in a campaign for PETA, protesting the clubbing of baby seals in Canada and later wrote on behalf of the organization to McDonald's over the conditions of their slaughterhouses.

=== 2012–2013: Warrior and other projects ===
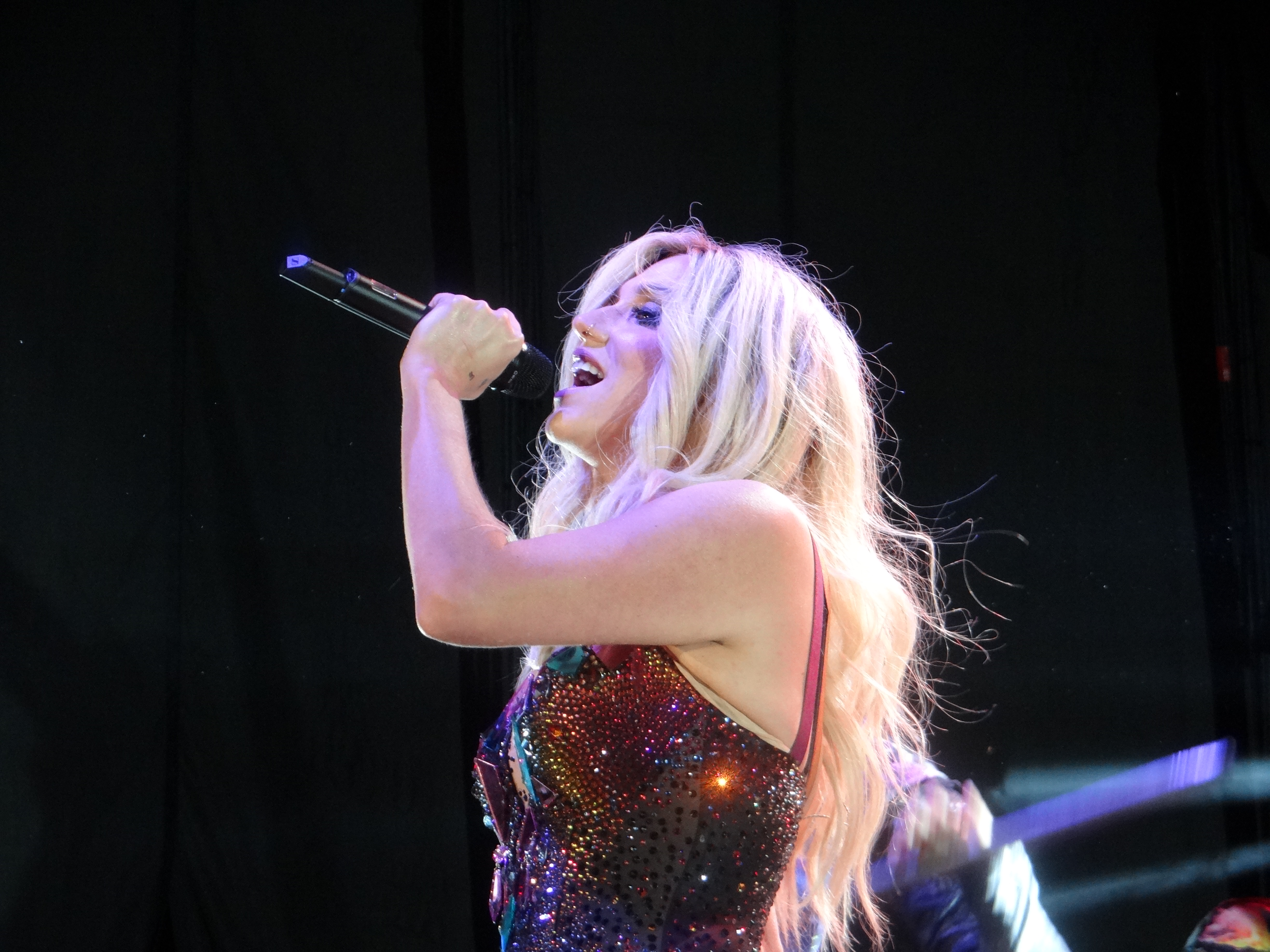
Kesha during her Warrior Tour

Kesha's second studio album, Warrior, was released on November 30, 2012. She began writing for the album while on her own headlining tour in 2011. The album featured productions from Max Martin, as well as a song by Wayne Coyne, the lead singer of the psychedelic rock band The Flaming Lips. Coyne had reached out to Kesha for a collaboration after hearing that she was a fan of the band. Besides working on Kesha's album, they recorded the song "2012 (You Must Be Upgraded)" for the band's album, The Flaming Lips and Heady Fwends (2012). To coincide with the release of the album, Kesha released the illustrated autobiography My Crazy Beautiful Life through Touchstone Books in November 2012. The first single taken from Warrior was "Die Young". The song debuted at number thirteen on the Billboard Hot 100 and eventually peaked at number 2. The song also charted across Europe and the English-speaking world and reached the top ten in Australia, Canada, and Belgium.

"C'Mon", the album's second single, underperformed commercially, only peaking at number 27 on the Billboard Hot 100 and ending her string of top ten hits on the chart. Despite this, "C'Mon" continued Kesha's streak of top ten hits (with nine) on the Mainstream Top 40 Pop Songs chart, also graphed by Billboard. In July 2013, Kesha started the Warrior Tour, which would support the album. The North American leg was co-headlined with American rapper Pitbull. Kesha's third single from Warrior, "Crazy Kids", was released in April 2013 and also under-performed, peaking at number 40 on the Hot 100, number 19 on the Mainstream Top 40, yet did achieve massive success in South Korea and Belgium, peaking at numbers 2 and 5 in those countries, respectively. A TV documentary, Kesha: My Crazy Beautiful Life, began airing on MTV also in April 2013.

In July 2013, The Flaming Lips stated their intention of releasing a full-length collaborative album with Kesha, called Lipsha. However, the project eventually cancelled in the winter of the same year. Kesha sent a message to a fan expressing how it was out of her control and that she wanted to release the material, even for free, saying that she did not care about the money. On October 7, 2013, Kesha and Pitbull released a collaboration, "Timber", which became an international commercial success and Kesha's third number-one and tenth top-ten single on the Billboard Hot 100.

=== 2014–2016: Lawsuit and personal struggles ===
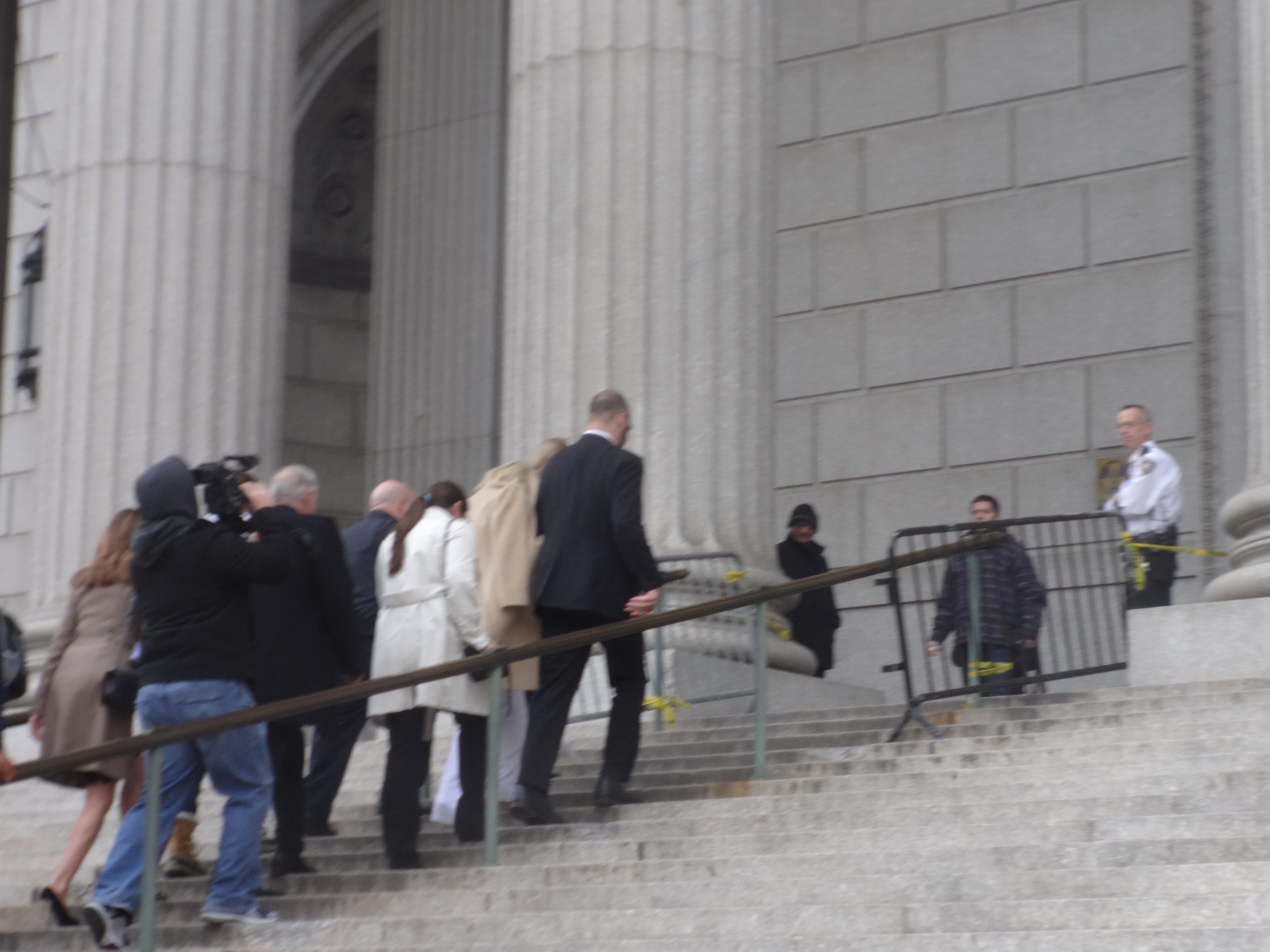
Kesha arrives at Supreme Court in 2016

In January 2014, Kesha checked into a rehabilitation center for bulimia nervosa and began to work on her third studio album. After rehab, she switched to using her birth name, Kesha, rather than her previous moniker, Ke$ha. In her 2014 Teen Vogue cover interview, Kesha revealed she recorded 14 new songs while in rehab. In June 2014, Kesha claimed a seat as an expert in the American television singing competition Rising Star, alongside Brad Paisley and Ludacris.

In October 2014, Kesha sued producer Dr. Luke for sexual assault and battery, sexual harassment, gender violence, emotional abuse, and violation of California business practices which had occurred over 10 years working together. The lawsuit went on for nearly a year before Kesha sought a preliminary injunction to release her from Kemosabe Records. On February 19, 2016, New York Supreme Court Justice Shirley Kornreich ruled against this request. On April 6, 2016, Kornreich dismissed the case, saying that even if the allegations of sexual assault were accepted as true, the five-year statute of limitations had run out on the two most specific rape allegations; one occurring in 2005 and the other in 2008.

On August 4, 2015, Kesha signed with American performance rights organization SESAC Inc. Kesha guest starred in the second season of the U.S. television series Jane the Virgin, which aired on October 12, 2015. The singer played Annabelle, the show's protagonist's hostile neighbor. In December 2015, Kesha revealed that she had formed a country music and classic rock-influenced band called Yeast Infection and performed a live show with the band in Nashville on December 23.

=== 2016–2018: Rainbow and touring ===
Kesha appeared during Zedd's slot at the 2016 Coachella music festival to perform "True Colors", a track from Zedd's second studio album. The cameo marked her first high-profile public performance since her ongoing legal battle with Dr. Luke. A studio version of the collaboration was released as a single on April 29, 2016. On May 22, 2016, Kesha covered Bob Dylan's song "It Ain't Me Babe" at the 2016 Billboard Music Awards. On June 11, 2016, Kesha performed at Pride in the Street in Pittsburgh, Pennsylvania. Afterwards, Kesha embarked on her third worldwide concert tour, the Kesha and the Creepies: Fuck the World Tour (2016–2017). The tour commenced on July 23, 2016, in Las Vegas and ended on July 21, 2017, in Aurora, Illinois, after various shows in China as well. The tour included various covers of songs and several rock and country reworks of Kesha's own hit singles. During this time, it was revealed that Kesha had recorded 22 songs on her own and had given them to her label, and was in the process of recording a third studio album.

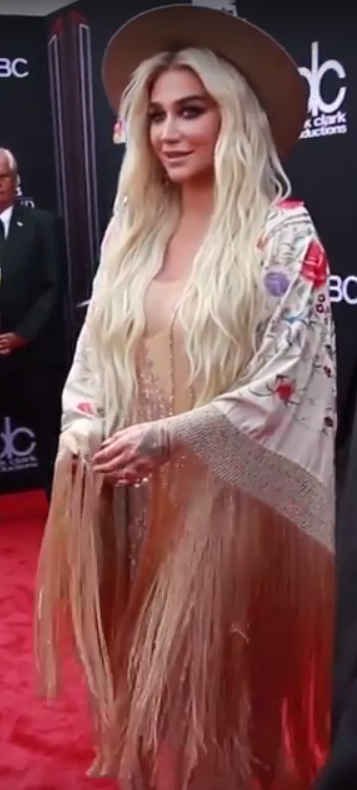
Kesha at the 2018 Billboard Music Awards

On July 6, 2017, Kesha released a single, titled "Praying". The single charted successfully at number 6 on the music charts of Australia, selling over 140,000 copies and being certified 2× Platinum in the country. The single charted at number 22 and number 11 in the United States and Canada respectively, and subsequently was certified Platinum in both territories. "Praying" was released as the lead single from Kesha's third studio album, Rainbow, which was released on August 11, 2017. Rainbow debuted at number one on the Billboard 200 chart in the United States, becoming her second number-one album in the country, and was the subject of universal acclaim from music critics, with several complimenting the album's feminist angle and uniqueness as well as Kesha's vocal performance and ability to interweave different music genres. Three tracks from Rainbow were released as promotional singles ahead of the album's release; "Woman", "Learn to Let Go", and "Hymn", all of which have accompanying music videos. "Woman" was later released as the second single from the album in January 2018, charting in the lower regions of the record charts in the United States, Canada and Australia, and became the second platinum-certified single from the album in the US. The album received nominations for Best Pop Vocal Album and Best Pop Solo Performance (for "Praying") at the 60th Annual Grammy Awards, marking Kesha's first Grammy nominations.

To promote Rainbow, Kesha embarked on the Rainbow Tour (2017–2019), which began on September 26, 2017, in Birmingham, Alabama, and visited North America, Europe, Oceania, and Asia. She furthered promotion by joining a co-headlining concert tour with American rapper Macklemore named The Adventures of Kesha and Macklemore (2018). This tour took place in North America between June 6, 2018, and August 5, 2018. Kesha's documentary film, Rainbow: The Film, was released on Apple Music on August 10, 2018. The documentary chronicles her stint in rehab for her eating disorder and the creation of Rainbow. In the same month, Kesha collaborated with British rock band The Struts on the remix of their song "Body Talks", released as a single from their album Young & Dangerous (2018). On September 19, 2018, Kesha released her song "Here Comes the Change", which served as a single to promote On the Basis of Sex (2018), a biographical film about Ruth Bader Ginsburg. In October 2018, Kesha collaborated, wrote, and performed on the song "Safe" with her younger brother Sage Sebert and rapper Chika as an homage for the Parkland high school shooting.

=== 2019–2022: High Road ===
In February 2019, Kesha hosted a 4-day-long cruise called Kesha's Weird and Wonderful Rainbow Ride. Sailing on the Norwegian Pearl, the cruise set off in Tampa, Florida, and ended in Nassau, Bahamas. Special guests included Wrabel, Jonathan Van Ness, Betty Who, Detox, and Superfruit, among others. On June 2, Kesha released a digital single titled "Rich, White, Straight Men". On July 25, Kesha released the promo single "Best Day" for the film The Angry Birds Movie 2. On November 7, Kesha officially announced her own cosmetics line in partnership with indie makeup brand Hipdot, Kesha Rose Beauty, which was released December 3. The line features an eyeshadow palette with each color named after her songs, two double-ended waterproof eyeliners, a red lipstick, and a lipgloss.

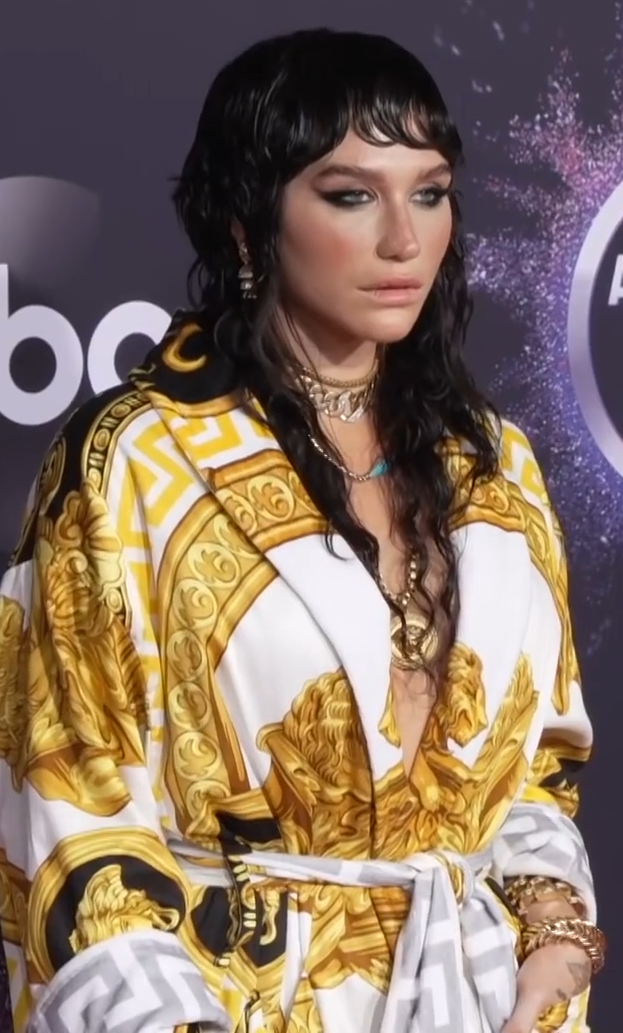
Kesha at the 2019 American Music Awards

High Road, Kesha's fourth studio album, was released January 31, 2020. The album performed moderately commercially and received positive reviews. Originally slated for December 2019, Kesha released a trailer on October 21, 2019, to confirm the album's title as High Road. Prior to its release, the album saw the release of four singles: "Raising Hell" featuring Big Freedia, "My Own Dance", "Resentment" featuring Brian Wilson, Sturgill Simpson and Wrabel, and "Tonight". She was set to embark on her fifth headlining tour, the High Road Tour in 2020, but it was ultimately cancelled due to the coronavirus pandemic.

In February 2020, Kesha's 2010 promotional single "Cannibal" gained viral status following a dance trend using it on the video sharing platform TikTok. Following this, the song became a top 40 single in Canada and a new lyric video for the song was released. While self-isolating in her home due to the coronavirus pandemic, Kesha created a song titled "Home Alone". On April 18, 2020, she performed at the One World: Together at Home benefit event.

Kesha announced the creation of her own podcast, Kesha and the Creepies, with an announcement video on November 13, 2020. The podcast explores supernatural subjects and alternative lifestyles with pop culture guests and supernatural experts such as Alice Cooper, Demi Lovato, Tyler Henry, Ben Folds and more. The series launched on November 20, 2020, with new episodes premiering almost every Friday. The first season ran for 30 episodes, with the final episode airing on June 10, 2021.

She later released several collaborations throughout 2020 and 2021, including "Chasing Rainbows" with Big Freedia, "Since I Was Young" with Wrabel, "Stronger" with Dutch DJ, Sam Feldt, and remixes of Walker Hayes' single, "Fancy Like", and Grandson's "Drop Dead".

Following the cancellation of the High Road Tour due to the COVID-19 pandemic, Kesha embarked on her fifth headlining tour, Kesha Live (2021), with Betty Who serving as the opening act. The tour began on August 13, 2021, in Billings, Montana, and was originally to have 11 shows in the U.S. but got extended to 22, ending on September 12, 2021. Seven more tour dates were announced for late March 2022, which was to be followed by Kesha's second cruise tour, scheduled to set sail on April 1, 2022. However, the cruise and the spring tour dates were cancelled due to undisclosed reasons.

In late August 2021, Kesha served as executive producer and starred in the scripted podcast, Electric Easy, a musical neo-noir science fiction show set in a futuristic Los Angeles in which humans struggle to co-exist with robots, known as "electrics". The podcast also starred actor Mason Gooding and singer Chloe Bailey and featured original music from Kesha. The show was created by Vanya Asher and executively produced by Kesha. The podcast premiered on August 30, 2021.

Kesha provided vocals for the song "Taste So Good", which also featured Hayley Kiyoko, Vincint, and MNEK. The song was released on June 1, 2022, and was used to promote the cannabis infused drink, Cann. She starred in and produced the show, Conjuring Kesha, which premiered on July 8, 2022, on Discovery+. In the show, Kesha and her guests explore paranormal hotspots.

=== 2023–present: Gag Order, lawsuit settlement and Period ===
On an Instagram Livestream in February 2023, Kesha previewed a 30-second snippet of a new song. On her 36th birthday, the singer wiped her Instagram feed, and updated her profile picture to her new logo. In a second livestream, she revealed four new song titles: "Living in My Head", "Fine Line", "The Drama", and "Eat the Acid", and shared snippets of the latter two.

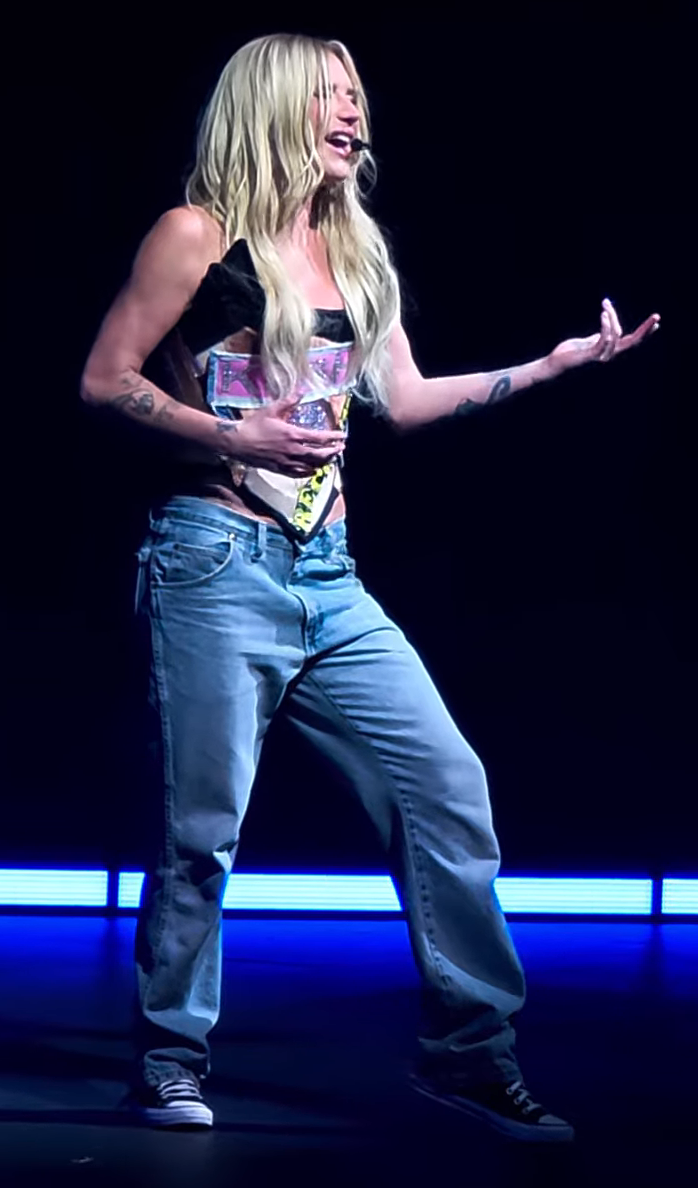
Kesha performing during the Tits Out Tour (2025)

The singer announced the album's title to be Gag Order, along with unveiling its artwork on April 25, 2023. The album was released on May 19, 2023, supported by three singles: "Eat the Acid" and "Fine Line" (released as a dual single), and, separately, "Only Love Can Save Us Now". Produced by Rick Rubin, the project sees Kesha at her most vulnerable and digs into her "uglier" emotions. The album focused on overcoming trauma and depression from the lawsuit with her former producer, Dr. Luke. To promote the album, Kesha would embark on her sixth headlining tour, the Gag Order Tour, which would later be renamed the Only Love Tour, following the settlement of her lawsuit.

Through a joint statement, Kesha and Dr. Luke announced on June 22, 2023, that their case was officially settled, a month before the case was to go to trial. In her statement, Kesha says that while she doesn't recall everything that happened the night of the alleged assault, she is looking forward to moving on with her life and wishes peace to all parties involved. Dr. Luke continued to deny Kesha's original claims in his statement. Details of the settlement were not revealed immediately. This came after The Court of Appeals in New York ruled that Dr. Luke is a limited public figure. Dr. Luke would have needed to prove that Kesha acted in malice when she filed her lawsuit, and she would've been able to recover fees for the litigation beginning in 2020.

Following the settlement, Kesha went on her social media and expressed her gratitude to her supporters and said she was excited for the "beautiful things to come". The next day, she announced her third extended play, Gag Order (Live Acoustic EP from Space) and revealed its cover art. The EP contains four live acoustic performances from her album. In June 2023, Kesha was featured in the season 1 finale of the YouTube adult animated series, Helluva Boss, where she voiced Beelzebub "Queen Bee". On December 18, 2023, seven months after the release of her last contractual album, Variety reported Kesha had parted ways with Dr. Luke's Kemosabe Records and distributor RCA as their contract expired. At the same time, Kesha also amicably split with Vector Management. She released a statement thanking her former manager, Jack Rovner.

Kesha taught a two-and-a-half week songwriting course called 'The Alchemy of Pop Music' at the Esalen Institute in early 2024. It was reported in early February 2024 that Kesha had officially signed with Crush Management. In an interview with V magazine, Kesha shared that she has been writing new music and stated, "There is a day marked on my calendar when I am free to release music." On June 29, 2024, Kesha announced her new single, "Joyride", which was released on July 4 through her self-titled label, Kesha Records. This marks her first release after parting ways with Kemosabe and RCA Records. "Joyride" became her first song to chart on the UK Singles Chart since 2017, while also reaching the top-ten on three component charts in the United States, and has accumulated over 100 million streams on Spotify. Kesha's independent record label entered a distribution deal with Alternative Distribution Alliance, owned by Warner Music Group, in September 2024.

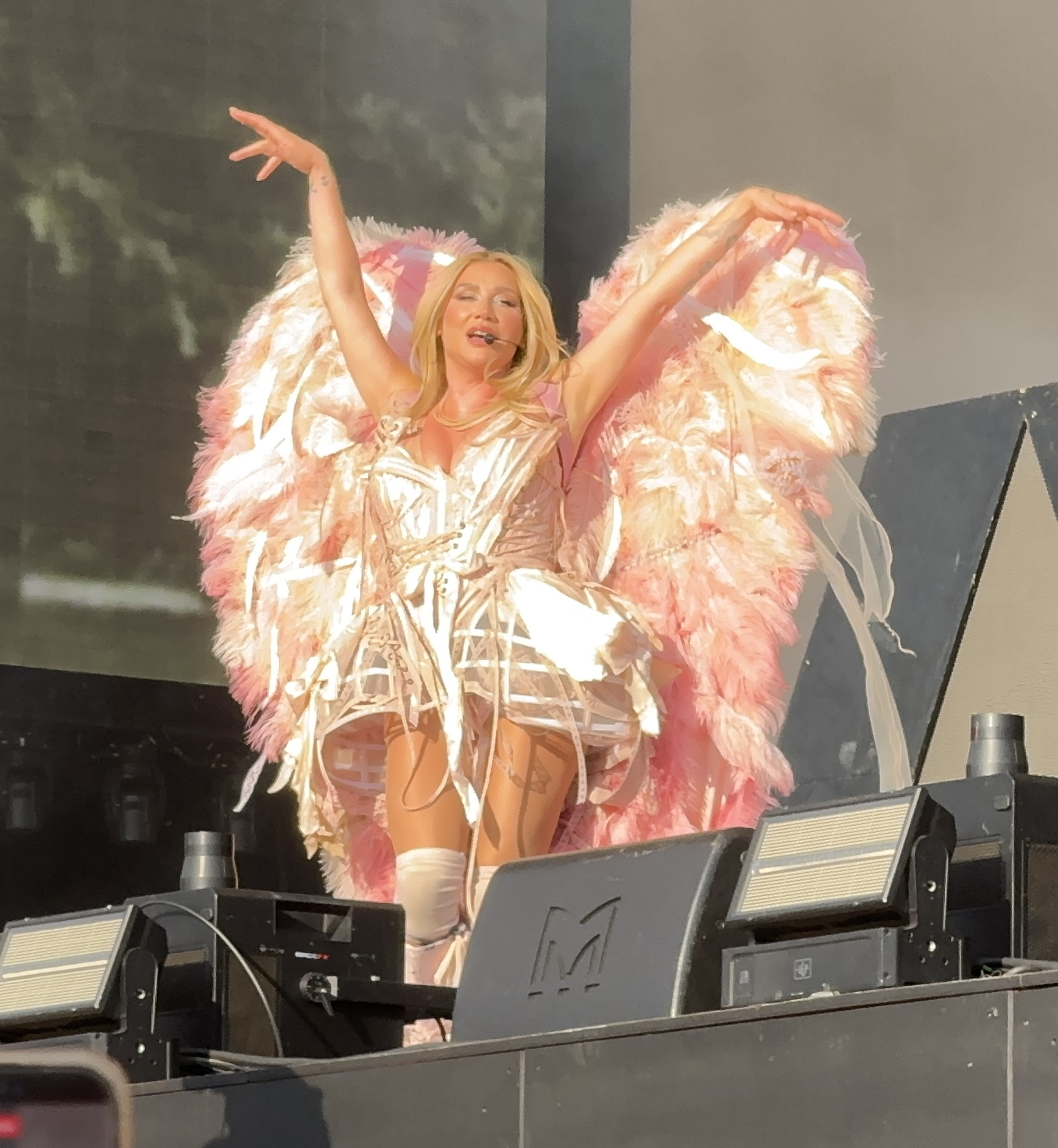
Kesha performing on the British Summer Time stage at Hyde Park in July 2026

On October 14, 2024, Kesha was featured on the remix of Charli XCX's song "Spring Breakers", which was featured on the latter's album, Brat and It's Completely Different but Also Still Brat. The following day, a cover of Lindsey Buckingham's song, "Holiday Road" was released as part of Spotify Singles Holiday. "Holiday Road" reached number 38 on the UK Singles Chart and number 88 on the US Billboard Hot 100, making it her first song to chart on the US Billboard Hot 100 since her 2017 collaboration with Macklemore, "Good Old Days". She released "Delusional" on November 29 as the second single from her sixth album.

On January 24, 2025, Kesha released the song, "Dear Me", which was written by Diane Warren. On March 27, 2025, Kesha released the single, "Yippee-Ki-Yay", featuring T-Pain. On the same day, Kesha announced her sixth studio album, Period, which was released on July 4, 2025. Kesha announced The Tits Out Tour on April 3, 2025, co-headlined by the Scissor Sisters, with dates in the United States and Canada. In April 2025, the dating app Feeld announced that it was the official partner of the tour. The tour started on July 1 and ends on August 10. On May 16, 2025, the album's fourth single, "Boy Crazy", was released. On June 20, 2025, Kesha released "Attention!", a song with Rose Gray and Slayyyter. On July 8, 2025, Kesha surprise released a deluxe version of the Period album, with the stylized title . (...), which featured three new songs. One of the new tracks was "Attention!", alongside a new version of "Boy Crazy" featuring Jade of British girl group Little Mix. The deluxe album also featured several remixes of tracks from Period. On October 2, 2025, Kesha signed a new management deal with Red Light Management, represented by Mary Hillard Harrington.

Shortly after the conclusion of the Tits Out Tour, Kesha embarked on The Freedom Tour—consisting of thirty-two concerts in Ireland, North America, and the United Kingdom—from May 23 to August 30, 2026. On this tour, Kesha played BST Hyde Park alongside Pitbull. She was also set to play Roundhay Festival and Dreamland Margate, but, has since cancelled due to scheduling issues. On May 8, 2026, Kesha released the single, "Origami!". Sixteen years after its original release, Kesha released the official music video for the song, "Backstabber" on October 26, 2026.

== Artistry ==
=== Musical style and image ===
"Tik Tok"
Kesha's debut single combines yodeling and video game music, with its lyricism centering around alcohol consumption and parties.

"Dinosaur"
"Dinosaur", following a verse-chorus formula, mixes dance-pop with rapping and is composed in a jungle-beat-tempo and incorporates a whistle-synth. The lyrics discuss an older gentleman attempting to hit on younger women, adding carnivory and predatory behavior as motifs to further the metaphor.

Kesha's music generally incorporates a fusion of pop, electronic, dance, and hip-hop, which is often categorized as electropop, dance-pop, synth-pop, and pop-rap. Her music has also explored country, rock, folk, soul, and gospel. Kesha wrote or co-wrote every song on her first two albums and considers herself a songwriter primarily, writing for artists including Britney Spears and Miley Cyrus. Along with a mezzo-soprano voice, she possesses a "strong, sneering vibrato", with a distinct yodel-like quality to her voice; she employs actual yodeling on the songs "Tik Tok" and "Cannibal".

Having previously done country, pop rock, and electro, she had a clear idea of the synth-pop sound that she wanted for her debut album. The genre was popular at the time with many of her peers releasing similar sounds. Both of those albums are of the genre with catchy hooks and synthesized productions often compared to pop singer Dev by music critics, creating misunderstandings among the fans of the two. "Party at a Rich Dude's House" and "C U Next Tuesday" have 1980s derived backing, while "Stephen" begins with "Kansas-style vocal harmonies". "Dinosaur" follows a verse-chorus formula, and has a "cheerleader-type tune" reminiscent of "Hollaback Girl" (2005) by Gwen Stefani and "Girlfriend" (2007) by Avril Lavigne; the song uses the overt symbolism of dinosaurs, carnivory, and other primitive motifs to tell the story of an older man who preys on younger women. According to Kesha, the song is based on true events. While her vocals on Animal were heavily processed with auto-tune, often to produce rapid stuttering or over-pitch corrected vocal effects, leading to questions on vocal talent, she also expressed confidence in her abilities.

Kesha's second studio album Warrior used considerably less auto-tune, although it was still present in a number of songs. The album contained piano and guitar-driven ballads such as "Love into the Light", "Wonderland", and "Past Lives" that showcase non-auto-tuned vocals. Kesha also uses a trademark talky "white-girl" rapping style with exaggerated discordant phrasing and enunciation. This technique has led her to be recognized as a rapper, a designation that she did not embrace until fellow rappers André 3000, Wiz Khalifa, and Snoop Dogg endorsed her. On the subject, she said: "The first time someone called me a rapper, I started laughing. I was shocked, and thought it was hilarious. It's crazy and funny to me."

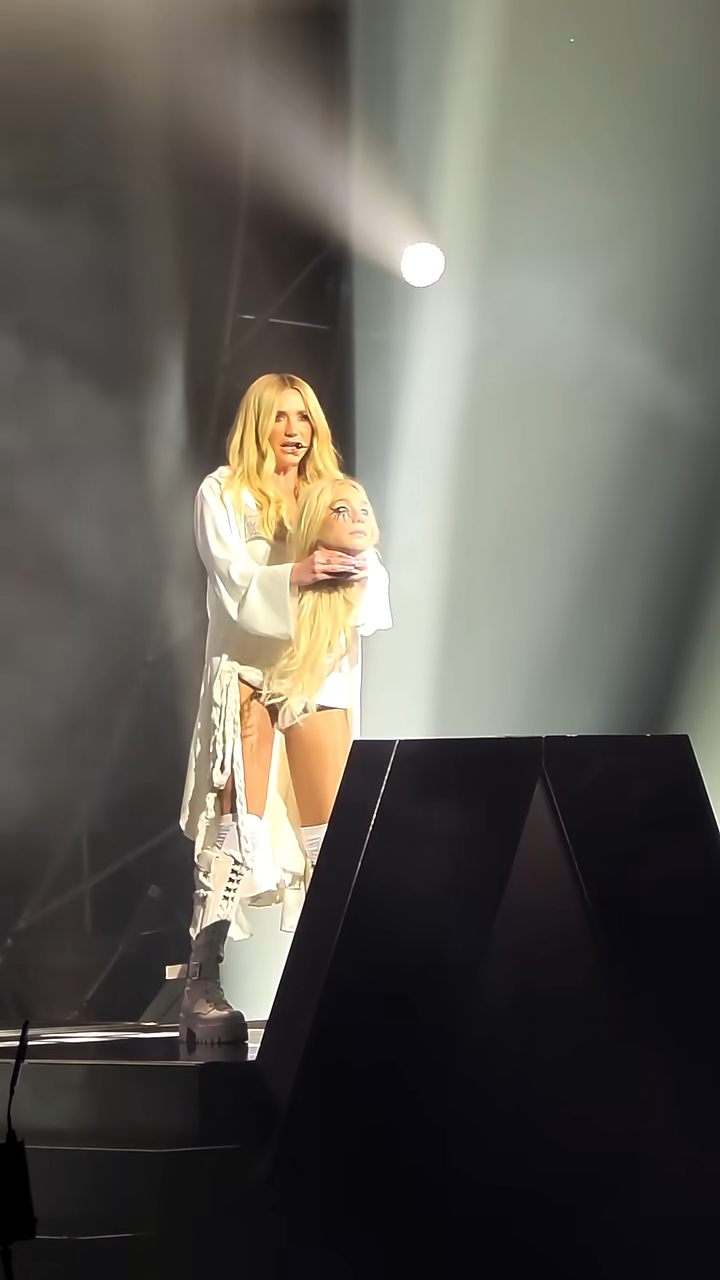
Kesha performing Tik Tok during the Tits Out Tour (2025)

The New York Times said Kesha "threatens to become the most influential female rapper of the day, or at least the most popular. Pretending Kesha isn't a rapper is no longer feasible." "Crazy Kids" and "C'Mon" took greater shifts into "party rap". Most of her lyrics chronicle her relationships and partying; the lighthearted subject matter of the latter and her unfiltered language saw many critics criticizing her for releasing frivolous and crass music. Jonah Weiner of Slate, however, stated that her jarring lyrics allowed her songs to become more memorable.

In "Blah Blah Blah" and "Boots & Boys", she objectifies men to poke fun at how male-fronted rock bands and rappers can get away with objectifying women and not vice versa. The title track to her debut, "Animal", is more aspirational and is intended to inspire people to embrace their individuality. Much more experimental than Animal, her second album, Warrior, employs dubstep elements, and contains some surrealism, including Kesha's erotic experiences with ghosts on the song "Supernatural" and reincarnation in the song "Past Lives". Overall, Kesha said the theme of Warrior is magic.

Critics praised Warrior for its rock music influences, despite the album being deeply rooted in technopop. Applauding the album's rock sound, Rolling Stone called the album Kesha's rock manifesto. Rock artists such as The Flaming Lips, Iggy Pop, and Alice Cooper have collaborated with Kesha, endorsing her as a rock singer. Cooper told Billboard, "I immediately looked at her and went, 'This girl is not a pop diva. She's a rock singer.' She would much rather be the female Robert Plant than the next Britney Spears." Kesha has stated that she wanted to pursue a more rock-oriented sound on this album but was prevented by her label. The A.V. Club said that Warrior proved Kesha a capable vocalist and songwriter. The Washington Post said that the album is "pure fun", opining that Kesha can write good hooks despite her sometimes vapid lyricism.

Her third album, Rainbow, displayed a significant departure from the electro-pop sound from Kesha's previous two albums. While still primarily a pop album, it contained elements of glam rock, country pop, and pop rock. Its lyrical themes range from letting go of the past, finding forgiveness within oneself for past mistakes, self-worth, and female empowerment. For her fourth album, High Road, Kesha blended her party-girl image and her more optimistic and sentimental approach on her previous album to show more range. Gag Order saw her take a much darker approach, in both her music and lyrics. The album primarily drew from the art pop, experimental, psychedelic and electronic genres, while lyrically she dove deep into her negative emotions due to the lawsuit with Dr. Luke. Period (.) saw Kesha explore themes of liberation, identity, and creative independence. Musically, the album incorporates elements of pop, disco, and electronic music, reflecting a return to her earlier playful and experimental sound.

=== Influences and legacy ===
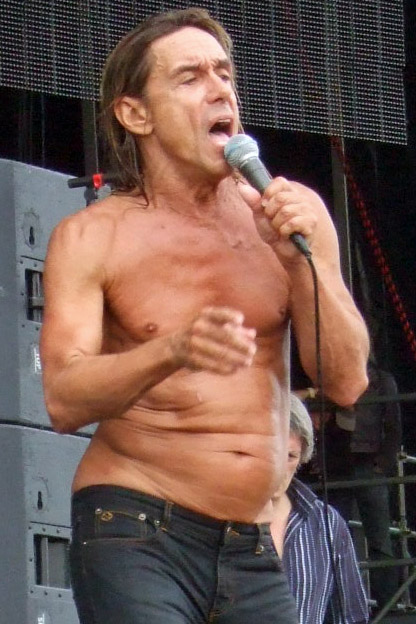
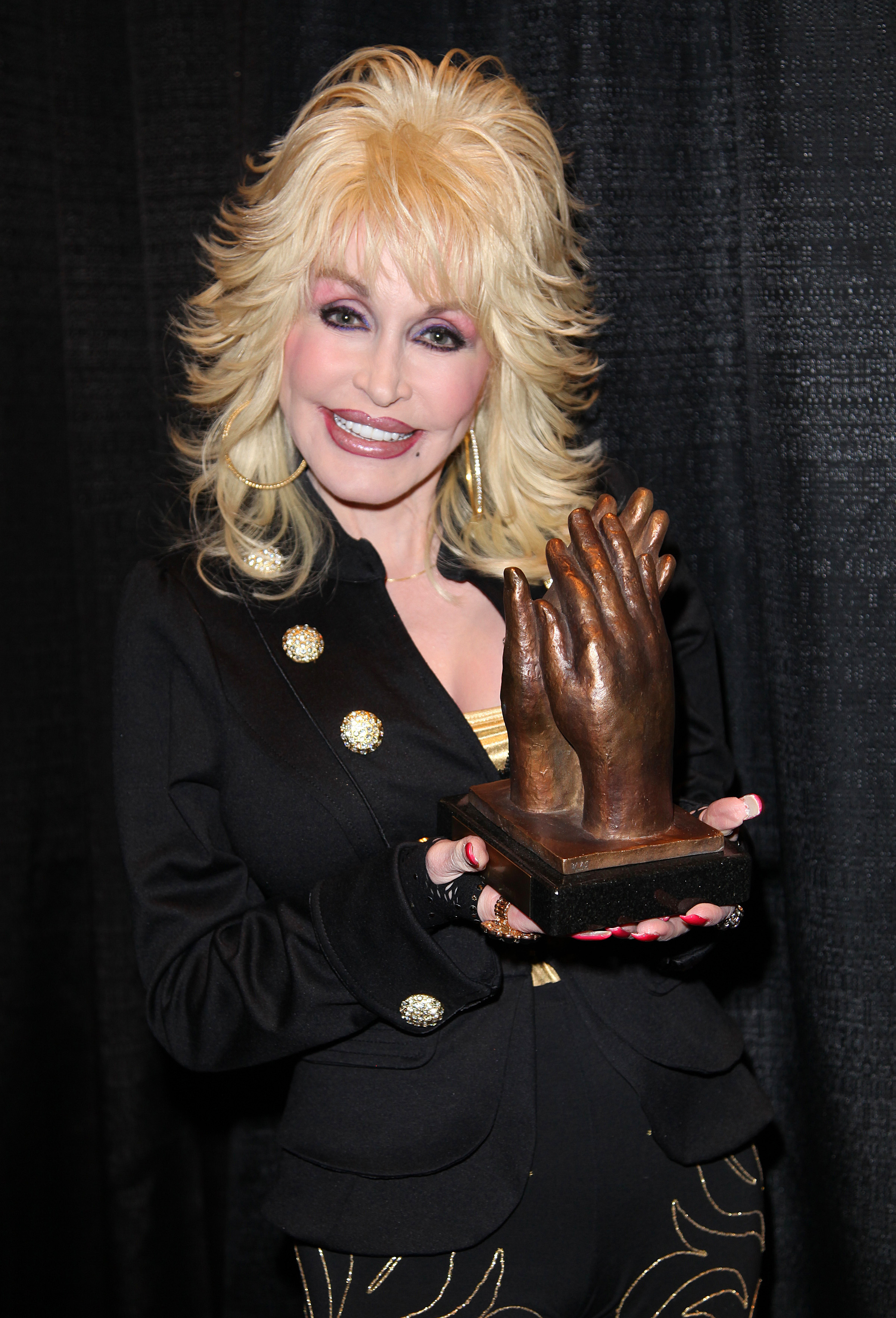
Artists like Iggy Pop (left) and Dolly Parton (right) have influenced Kesha.

Kesha has been influenced by various genres and artists; Madonna, Queen, the Rolling Stones, the Killers, Neutral Milk Hotel, the Black Eyed Peas, Gwen Stefani, Casiotone for the Painfully Alone, Janet Jackson, Michael Jackson, Gary Glitter, and Beck have all influenced her music. Her vocal style draws heavily from the song "Tthhee Ppaarrttyy" from the 2007 Justice album Cross. After experimenting with country, pop rock, and electronic music, Kesha stuck with the latter. Thematically, her music generally revolves around escapism, partying, individuality, supernatural moments, rebellion, and grief.

Kesha's musical influences also consist of hip hop, punk rock, crunkcore, glam rock, pop, dance music, and classic country. Her country influences of Dolly Parton and Johnny Cash come from her mother's country songwriting, while her older brother exposed her to hip-hop and punk bands, Fugazi, Dinosaur Jr. and the Beastie Boys. She credits her straightforward story-based lyrics to her love for the honest storytelling style of country music, while the title track from her debut album was created with music of alternative rock bands The Flaming Lips and Arcade Fire in mind.

She singled out the Beastie Boys as a major influence, telling Newsweek that she had always wanted to be like them and aspired to make "youthful, irreverent anthems" as well. She called her debut album, Animal, a homage to the Beastie Boys' Licensed to Ill and credited the creation of the rap driven "Tik Tok" to her love for the Beastie Boys' rap music. For her first headlining tour, Kesha wanted to emulate the stage theatrics of Iggy Pop. She listed Pop's The Idiot as well as Led Zeppelin and AC/DC as inspirations for her second studio album, Warrior, intended to feature 1970s rock inspired music. Warrior, to this effect, includes a collaboration with Pop himself.

She draws inspiration from films as well. Her stage makeup is characterized by dramatic glitter makeup at her right eye, inspired by A Clockwork Orange. The video for "Your Love Is My Drug" features animated sequences inspired by the Beatles' film, Yellow Submarine, while the Get Sleazy tour was described as having a "post-apocalyptic Mad Max vibe".

Her debut single "Tik Tok", which was released in 2009, was at one point the best-selling digital single in history, selling over 14 million units internationally, until surpassed in 2011. Kesha has sold over 100 million records worldwide, including 87 million tracks and streams as of 2017 and 14 million album equivalent units as of 2019. She is listed as the 26th top artist on Billboard's 2010s decade-end charts.

== Personal life ==
Kesha is a member of the LGBT community. She has previously identified as bisexual. In her 2019 Attitude article, she goes deeper in discussing her sexuality, saying: "I have always been attracted to the soul behind a person's eyes. It has never occurred to me to care about a specific gender, or how someone is identifying, to make me wonder about whether or not I'm attracted to them." In 2022, she clarified that she preferred not to label her sexuality, stating, "I'm not gay. I'm not straight. I don't know what I am. I love people ... I refuse to be anything, really, except for open to it all."

She has performed legal commitment ceremonies for both same-sex and opposite-sex couples. She has been involved with LGBT activism as well as animal rights. Kesha stated that she was born with a quarter-inch-long vestigial tail, "I had a tail when I was born...they chopped it off and stole my tail...I'm really sad about that story."

=== Advocacy ===
Kesha supports Time's Up, an advocacy group against sexual harassment. At the 2018 Grammys, she performed "Praying" with other notable women in music in support of the movement.

While performing in November 2023, Kesha altered the lyrics to her song "Tik Tok" from "Wake up in the morning feeling like P. Diddy" to "Wake up in the morning feeling just like me" to remove a reference to Sean "P. Diddy" Combs, a response to a lawsuit from Cassie Ventura that accused Combs of perpetuating several forms of abuse against her, including rape, over a decade-long period. During a guest appearance at singer Reneé Rapp's Coachella set in April 2024, she further altered the lyric to "wake up in the morning, like, 'Fuck P. Diddy'". This occurred after additional lawsuits had been filed against Combs. Kesha has stated that she plans to permanently perform the song with this lyrical change going forward.

=== Health problems ===
On January 3, 2014, Kesha checked into Timberline Knolls Residential Treatment Center in Lemont, Illinois, for eating disorder treatment. Kesha's mother confirmed that Kesha was suffering from the eating disorder bulimia nervosa and that she has struggled with it since she was signed. She also alleged that Dr. Luke was partly to blame, saying Luke had told her to lose weight after he signed her, comparing the shape of her body to a refrigerator. Kesha completed her treatment on March 6, 2014, after spending two months in rehab.

In her Self magazine cover, Kesha revealed that in 2022, she was diagnosed with common variable immunodeficiency, which made her feel fatigued every day. She assumed this was a result of being overworked. Kesha also revealed she almost died in January 2023 after a complication with freezing her eggs, and a few weeks later, she felt weak after a performance and was sent to the hospital for nine days. In an interview for Flood Magazine, she revealed she was diagnosed with complex PTSD in 2023.

=== Spiritual views ===
Writing for Lenny Letter, Kesha stated that she views God as "nature and space and energy and the universe. My own interpretation of spirituality isn't important, because we all have our own. What matters is that I have something greater than me as an individual that helps bring me peace." According to pop culture magazine Paper, "Homophobia and false piety eventually alienated [her] from Christianity and she's since settled on a non-denominational cocktail of meditation, mindfulness, and astrology." Kesha said she is occasionally a nihilist. She is "obsessed with religion".

=== Politics ===
Kesha has been an outspoken critic of US president Donald Trump. She wrote her 2018 single, "Woman" in protest of his "pussy grabbing comment", according to her interview with Metro.co.uk. She endorsed Joe Biden for the 2020 presidential election and Kamala Harris for the 2024 presidential election.

In February 2026, the White House published a video on its social media showing a fighter jet shooting a missile at a naval ship with the caption "Lethality". Kesha's single, "Blow", was used in the video. She publicly criticized the use of her song, which she deemed to make light of war. Kesha concluded her message with a reference to the Epstein files: "Also, don't let this distract us from the fact that criminal predator Donald Trump appears in the Files over a million times." White House Communications Director Steven Cheung responded with: "This just gives us more attention and more view counts to our videos because people want to see what they're bitching about. Thank you for your attention to this matter."

== Discography ==
Studio albums

- Animal (2010)
- Warrior (2012)
- Rainbow (2017)
- High Road (2020)
- Gag Order (2023)
- Period (2025)

== Tours ==
Headlining

- Get Sleazy Tour (2011)
- Warrior Tour (2013–2015)
- Kesha and the Creepies: Fuck the World Tour (2016–2017)
- Rainbow Tour (2017–2019)
- Kesha Live (2021)
- Only Love Tour (2023)
- House of Kesha (2024–2025)
- The Freedom Tour (2026)

Co-headlining

- North American Tour 2013 (with Pitbull) (2013)
- The Adventures of Kesha and Macklemore (with Macklemore) (2018)
- The Tits Out Tour (with Scissor Sisters) (2025–2026)

Supporting

- Rihanna – Last Girl on Earth (2010)

Cancelled

- High Road Tour (2020)

== Filmography ==
- Bravo Supershow (2007)
- Final Flesh (2009)
- Walt Disney's Princess Ke$ha (2011)
- Katy Perry: Part of Me (2012)
- Jem and the Holograms (2015)
- A Ghost Story (2017)
- Rainbow: The Film (2018)
- Impractical Jokers (2023)

== See also ==
- Songs written by Kesha
- List of artists who reached number one in the United States
