= My Crazy Beautiful Life =

2012 autobiography by Kesha

- First edition hardback cover
- Author: Kesha
- Language: English
- Genre: Autobiography
- Publisher: Touchstone, Simon & Schuster
- Publication date: November 20, 2012
- English publication date: November 20, 2012
- Pages: 192
- ISBN: 1476704163

My Crazy Beautiful Life is a 2012 illustrated autobiography by the pop singer Kesha and photographer/filmmaker Steven Greenstreet. Photography was also provided by Jason Sheldon and Lagan Sebert, who also helped develop the project with Kesha. The book was published by Simon & Schuster on November 20, 2012, to coincide with the release of her album Warrior on November 30, 2012. The book's title, My Crazy Beautiful Life is taken after her song "Crazy Beautiful Life" from her 2010 EP Cannibal.

== Synopsis ==
In My Crazy Beautiful Life, Kesha details her "thoughts and reflections" about her life and contains photographs from various points in her life, both before and after she became a singer. The singer has described the book as being "a more complete picture of what my life is really like". The book also goes into some of the meanings behind some of her song lyrics, with Kesha writing that her song "Blah Blah Blah" was "a conscious move to talk about men like they talked about women".

== Reception ==
Critical reception for the book has been mixed, with Vice stating that the book was "pretty boring" in comparison to her songs. A reviewer for The Atlantic commented that "some revealing nuggets from Ke$ha's frighteningly glittery new autobiography ... suggest that in some ways, she might be just what some of the 20th century's most famous feminist thinkers had in mind." The Daily Targum praised the book, calling it "[s]hort and sweet".
