= Get Sleazy Tour =

2011 concert tour by Kesha

- World tour by Kesha
- Promotional poster for 2011 tour
- Location: Europe; North America; Oceania; South America
- Associated album: Animal; Cannibal
- Start date: February 15, 2011
- End date: September 29, 2011
- Legs: 6
- No. of shows: 90

Kesha concert chronology
- Get Sleazy Tour (2011); North American Tour 2013 (2013)

The Get Sleazy Tour (stylized as Get $leazy Tour) was the debut concert tour by American singer Kesha in support of both her first album, Animal, and first extended play, Cannibal (both 2010). Officially announced on November 8, 2010, the tour visited the Americas, Australia and Europe. It was scheduled to visit Asia but due to the 2011 Tōhoku earthquake and tsunami, the tour was postponed indefinitely. Described by Kesha as "a ridiculously fun dance party", the concerts were presented as underground rave ups drawing inspiration from parties she would attend while growing up in Tennessee. The tour kicked off on February 15, 2011, in Portland, Oregon, and ended September 29, 2011, in Rio de Janeiro.

Critical reception to the tour has been generally mixed to positive. Kesha's vocals on the tour were generally praised although some critics noted the overuse of backtrack on some songs. Her charisma and stage presence was also generally met with positive reception. Despite Kesha receiving positive reviews her original opener, Beardo, was met with extremely negative reception with multiple critics calling him unfunny. After a successful sold out first run in North America, she extended her tour into the summer including dates in the United Kingdom and additional dates in the United States.

== Background and development ==
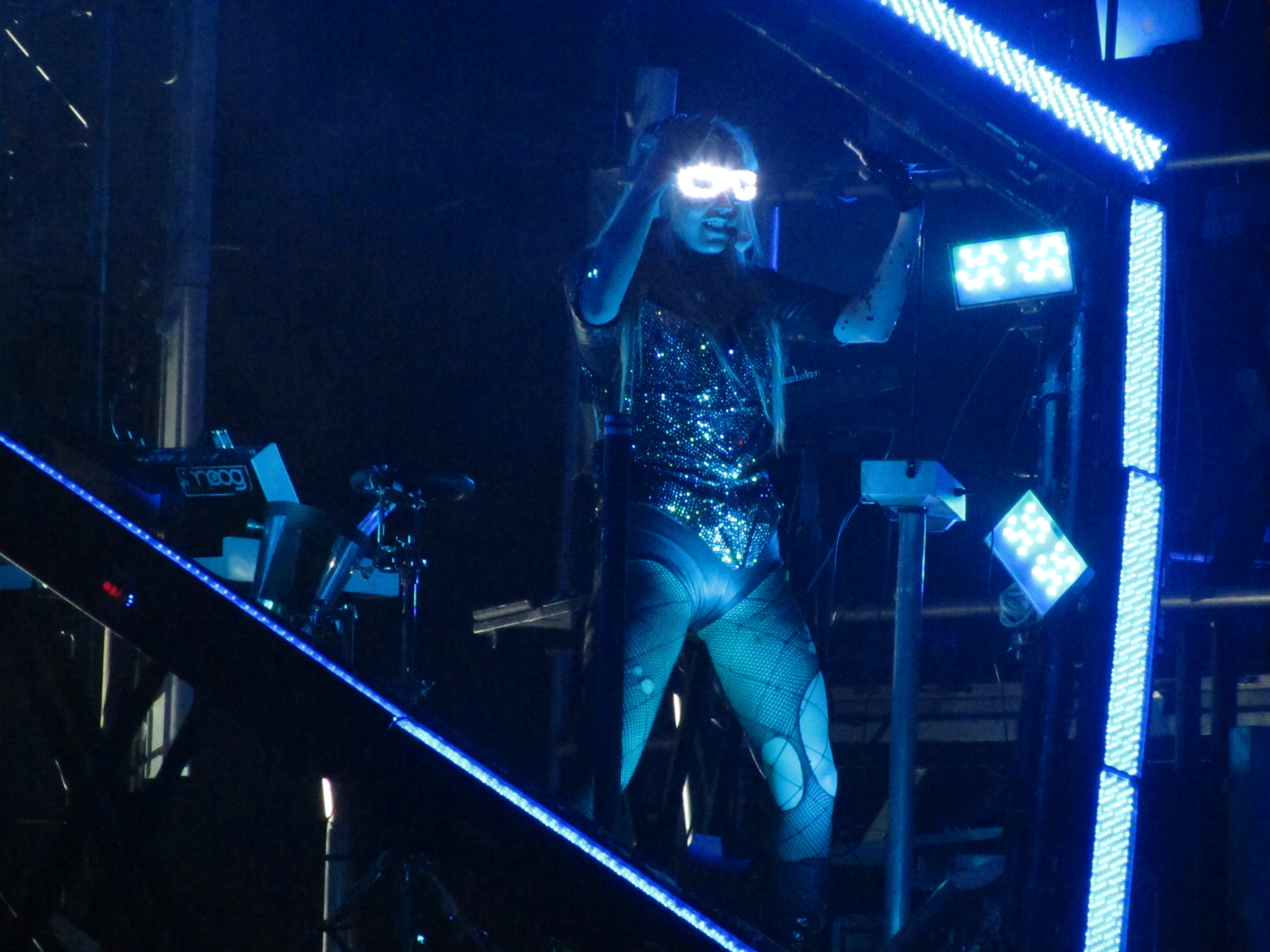
Kesha performing the concert's opening track "Sleazy" in Wantagh, New York

The tour was officially announced on November 8, 2010, via the artist's official website. The tour comes months after Kesha toured the United States with Rihanna as the opening act on her Last Girl on Earth and her own promotional tour in the United Kingdom during the Fall of 2010 to support her first studio album, Animal. During an interview with Gary Graff (from Billboard) Kesha explained her inspiration for the tour, describing it as "a ridiculously fun dance party that will build on the energetic sets she played while opening for Rihanna last summer." She elaborated,

"Visually it will just be assaulting, and sonically it will be assaulting. It's just going to be an assault of all your senses, but it's going to be really, really, really fun, [...] I want people to feel like they've come to my house party, and they can be the most raw and visceral version of themselves and not be judged. I want my show to be a place you can come and dress like a maniac and wear mental makeup, and it's totally cool."

Five concerts in Asia were originally planned for March 2011. Due to the 2011 Tōhoku earthquake and tsunami, the shows were postponed on March 15, 2011. The singer responded, "My heart is with Japan right now through this disaster and these hardships. I genuinely don't think right now would be appropriate timing for me to perform in Japan given the content and the spirit of my show, which is all about feeling exuberant, rowdy, and wild. I plan to bring my party there and to that part of the world when we are all ready to dance and Get $leazy together again. In the meantime I am going to do everything I can to help relief efforts and I encourage everyone in the world to do the same." After a successful run in North America, the singer extended her tour into the summer including dates in the United Kingdom and additional dates in the United States. Kesha described the extension saying, "My spring tour sold out so fast, which is amazing, but I want to get to party with errryone. If you are part of my family, my cult of rowdy misfits, come join us! I’m pulling out an ass-ton more glitter with blue lipstick to spare and I’m ready to party with all y’all all summer long. Sh–'s gonna be hot as a mofo [...] Miss this and you be missing the biggest dance party of the year!"

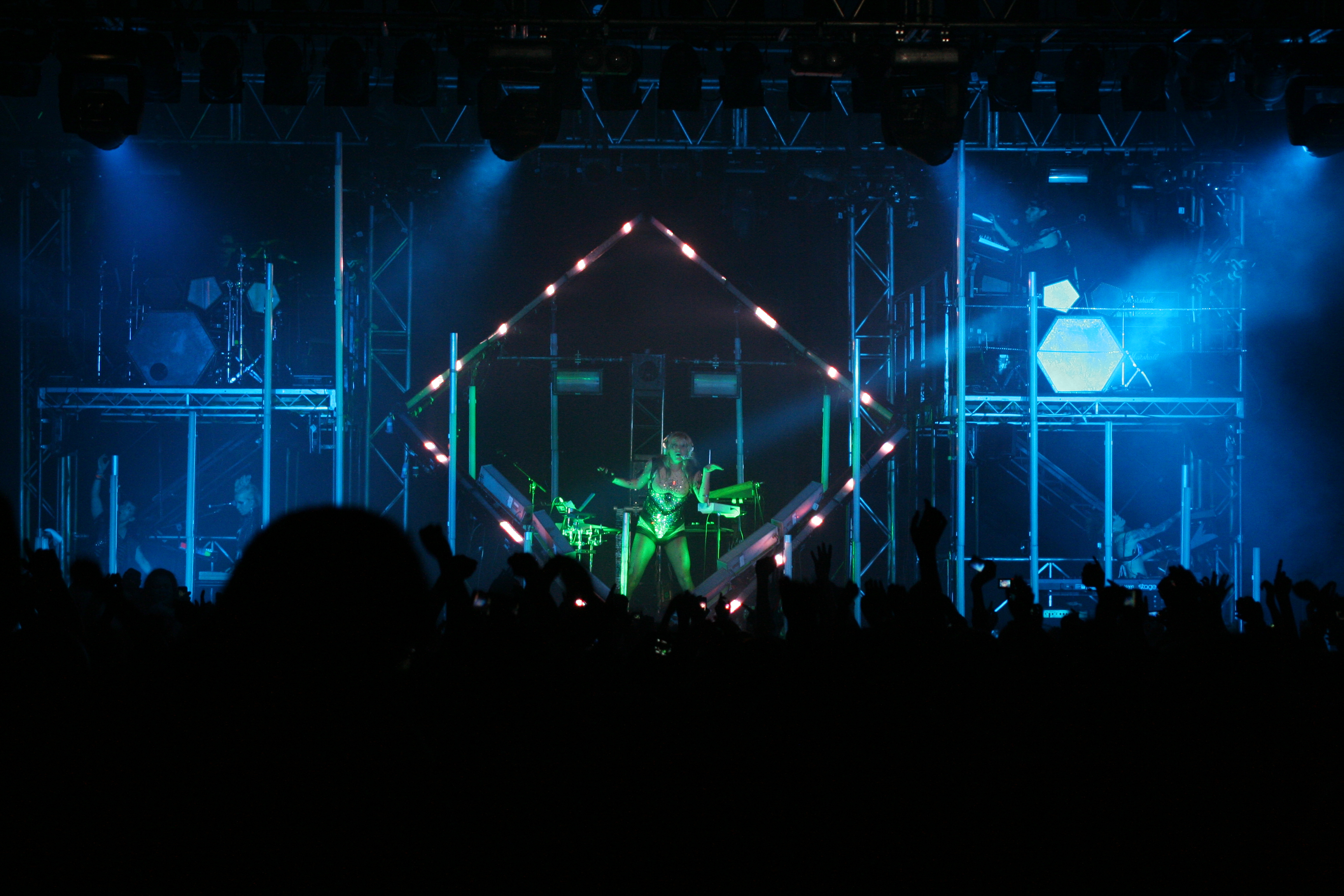
Kesha performing "Take It Off" in Sydney, Australia

The set list is mainly derived from Kesha's first album Animal, and follow-up extended play (EP) Cannibal. Besides tracks from those albums, Kesha incorporated covers of the Beastie Boys song, "(You Gotta) Fight for Your Right (To Party!)" to "give the show a more rock'n'roll edge." She told Kevin O'Donnell of Spin, "I've been on this Iggy Pop kick — he's just so inspiring to watch as a performer, [...] I'm trying to do something like that, minus the heroin and the stabbing myself part." The theme of the tour is "to bring the planet an epic dance party [...] That's my mentality with this tour — party as hard as we can and make it as infectious as possible. It's unlike anything anyone else in pop music is doing." Visually, the theaters and auditoriums hosting the show will be transformed and presented as "basement rave-ups". The inspiration came from her earlier life when she was growing up in Tennessee where she would attend parties. To achieve this look, the singer worked with the creative team responsible for Daft Punk's concerts. The look is described as Mad Max and "intergalactic spaceship" combination.

== Concert synopsis ==
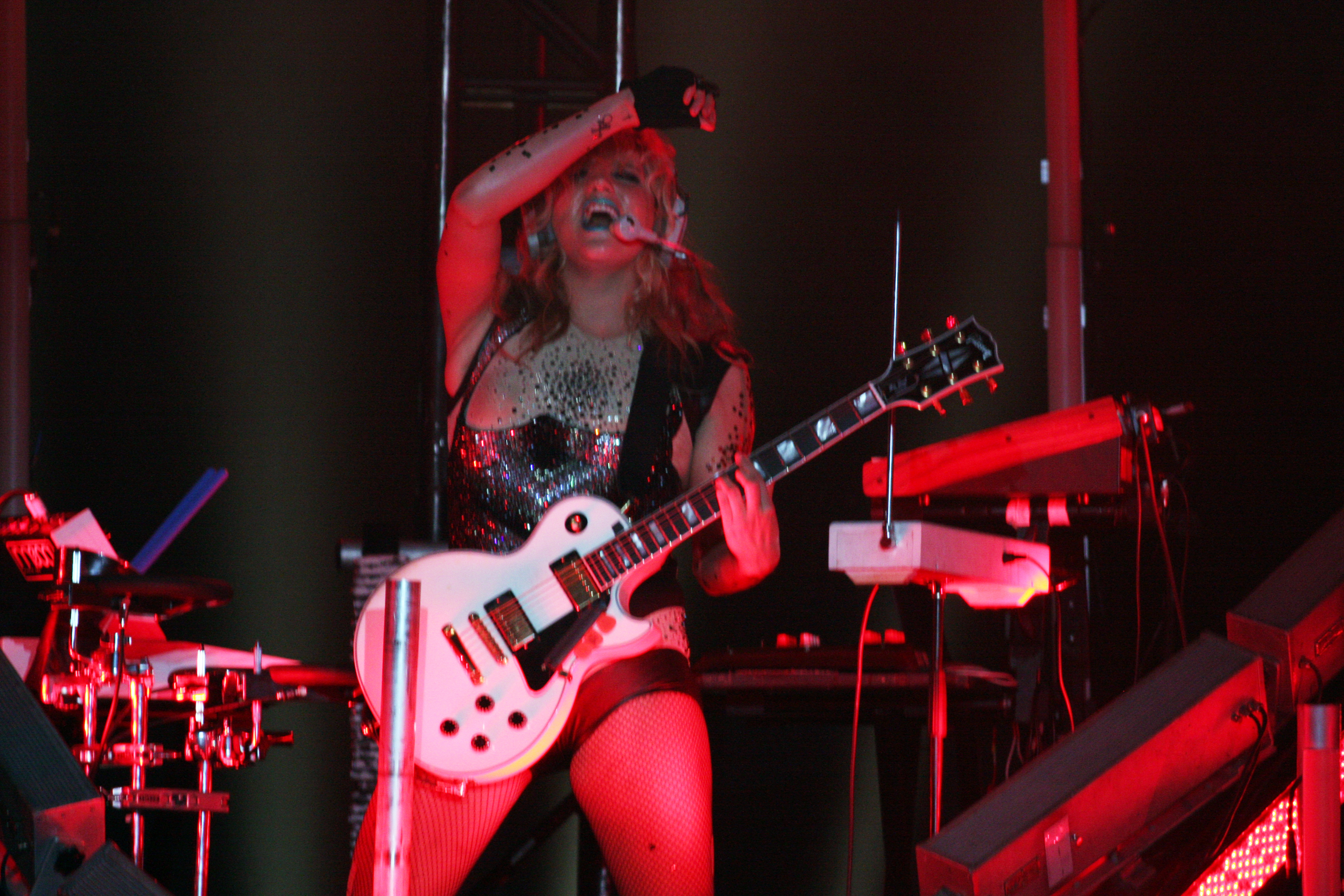
Kesha performing "Fuck Him He's a DJ" in Sydney, Australia

Opening with the concert's title track "Sleazy", Kesha, wearing glasses outlined by an arrangement of lights, a black leotard encrusted with rhinestones and diamonds, appears in the middle of a large structure in the shape of a diamond where she acts as the night's DJ. Surrounded by her band and background dancers, seen wearing clothing described as a blend between "Mad Max and [...] prehistoric birds", she remains in the structure while transitioning into the following song, "Take It Off". She performs the next two songs, "Fuck Him He's a DJ" and "Dirty Picture", in the structure as she presses buttons that set different synths into motion and plays on percussion boards. By the concert's fifth song, "Blow", she emerges from the structure and takes center stage, shooting glitter cannons at the audience.

During "Cannibal", Kesha, now wearing an American flag ensemble with black ripped fishnets, proceeds to tie up one of her male dancers to an X-shaped post. She then proceeds to pull a glowing red heart from the dancer's chest as fake blood covers herself and the man. For the final part of the evening, Kesha changes into a rhinestone infused skeleton bodysuit. The suit was also worn by Kesha when she kickstarted on the inaugural Conan Summer Concert Series. She later asks for a "man who enjoys being abused" from the audience; she brings him onto the stage, then duct tapes him to a chair, giving him a lap dance as she sings her song "Grow a Pear". As she sings, a background dancer dressed as a penis joins Kesha and the man on stage, dancing and jumping around. The concert is ended with "Tik Tok" and an encore consisting of "We R Who We R" and the Beastie Boys track "(You Gotta) Fight for Your Right (To Party!)".

== Critical reception ==
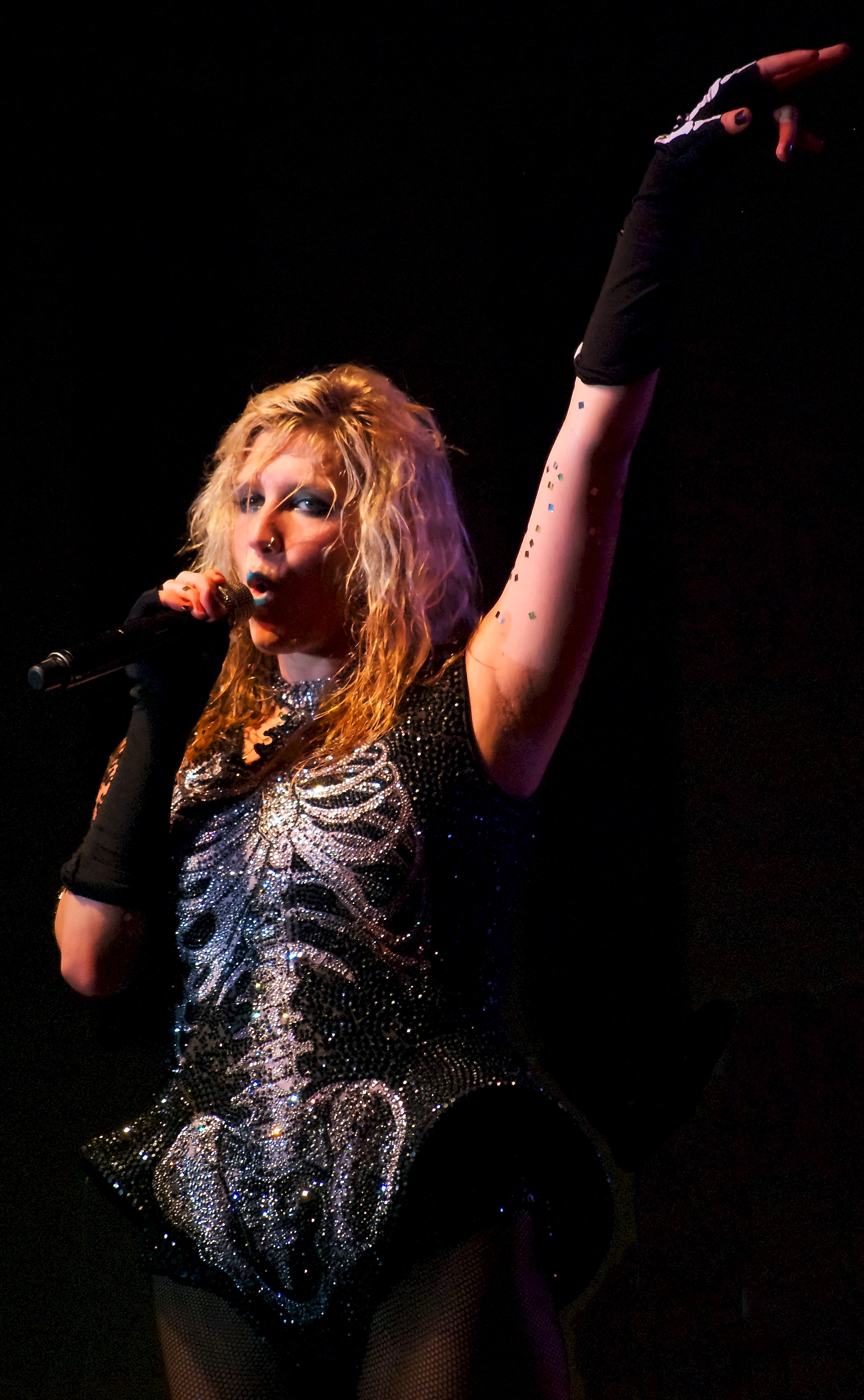
Kesha performing "Tik Tok" in a rhinestone infused skeleton bodysuit in Geneseo, New York

Stephan Lee from Entertainment Weekly was positive in the review of the concert. Lee was skeptical of the concert initially, citing her "less-than-stellar TV performances" as the reason for the apprehension but wrote that he was surprised at "how unexpectedly awesome the show was". Kesha's vocal performance was praised with Lee noting that her vocals sounded nearly identical to how her records sounded. The shows atmosphere was praised with Lee noting that "she packed infinitely more entertainment value and energy into the show by way of pure, unabashed silliness than Britney Spears did in her much more expensive and lavish Circus tour." Lee ended his review of the concert comparing Kesha to Lady Gaga, Katy Perry and Britney Spears stating that "I think Kesha doesn't get much respect because people have a hard time seeing what she brings to the table that other pop solo artists like Britney, Gaga, and Katy Perry don’t already, but her persona was fully on display last night, and it was all her own." Mark Lore from Spin, referring to an earlier quote by Kesha, "I'm going to bring the planet an epic dance party", wrote that she lived up to her word calling the night "such good, sleazy fun". "Cannibal" and "Grow a Pear" were two highlights from the review, being called "well-executed" and for not taking herself too seriously. Lore complimented the choice of set-list and the nights overall atmosphere praising the humor present throughout the show.

Jason MacNeil from the Toronto Sun wrote that the show's opening seemed a bit tame for someone like Kesha, writing that it was not until "Take It Off" "that stiffness slowly melted away." MacNeil's consensus for the show was, "It took her a little while to find that seedy, trashy animal magnetism she exudes so well, but when she did, pop singer Kesha was money in the bank." The review highlighted the show's theatrics, citing "Grow A Pear" as the strongest part of the show. MacNeil went on to give the concert three and a half stars out of five. Megan Buerger of the Washington Post called the concert "an assaulting tribute to partying and debauchery." Buerger praised her charisma on her singles writing that she had consistent "unfaltering energy" on them. Her vocals on "Animal" and "The Harold Song" were called "startling" with Buerger writing that "despite her efforts to hide it, there seems to be a singer behind all that sleaze. Perhaps the most startling moment of the evening featured the lone Kesha on stage [...] she offered a fleeting glimpse at her under-utilized vocal talent." The review of the concert was ended with the consensus that "her refusal to take herself seriously is refreshing and even a little endearing. She may be rough around the edges, but boring, she's not."

Bree Davies from Westword criticized the opening act, Beardo, calling him an unfunny and unbelievable version of "Weird-Al-meets-License-to-Ill-era-Beastie-Boys". Davies had a positive impression of the concert overall, praising her stage presence for "her ability to keep every pair of mostly-female eyes on her at all times" and for presenting an "expensive-looking big bang-up stage show combined with lowest common denominator pop". David Burger from The Salt Lake Tribune criticized Kesha's stage presence and charisma blaming it on the venue. The review highlighted songs such as "Tik Tok" and "Your Love Is My Drug" but criticized the middle third of the show which featured ballads. Matt Farley and Erica Boniface from KUSA gave credit to Kesha's performance and live band for "sticking to her R-rated guns". Her opener Beardo however, was deemed "possibly the worst act ever to perform at the Fillmore". Lauren Carter from Boston Herald wrote that the show was "technically a success" praising her vocals on her songs that "all knocked appropriately." Carter was also negative in the review however, criticizing her on her insistence "on seeming wild, crazy and amoral, which for anyone not drunk or ensnared in the Ke$ha web, was simply draining."

== Opening acts ==
- Beardo (North America—Leg 1,3)
- 3OH!3 (Geneseo)
- Natalia Kills (United Kingdom)
- LMFAO (United Kingdom, North America—Leg 3)
- Spank Rock (North America—Leg 3)

== Setlist ==
1. "Sleazy"
2. "Take It Off"
3. "Fuck Him He's a DJ"
4. "Dirty Picture"
5. "Blow"
6. "Blah Blah Blah"
7. "Party at a Rich Dude's House"
8. "Backstabber"
9. "Cannibal"
10. "The Harold Song"
11. "C U Next Tuesday"
12. "Animal"
13. "Dinosaur"
14. "Grow a Pear"
15. "Your Love Is My Drug"
16. "Tik Tok"

Encore

17. "We R Who We R"
18. "(You Gotta) Fight for Your Right (To Party!)"

== Tour dates ==
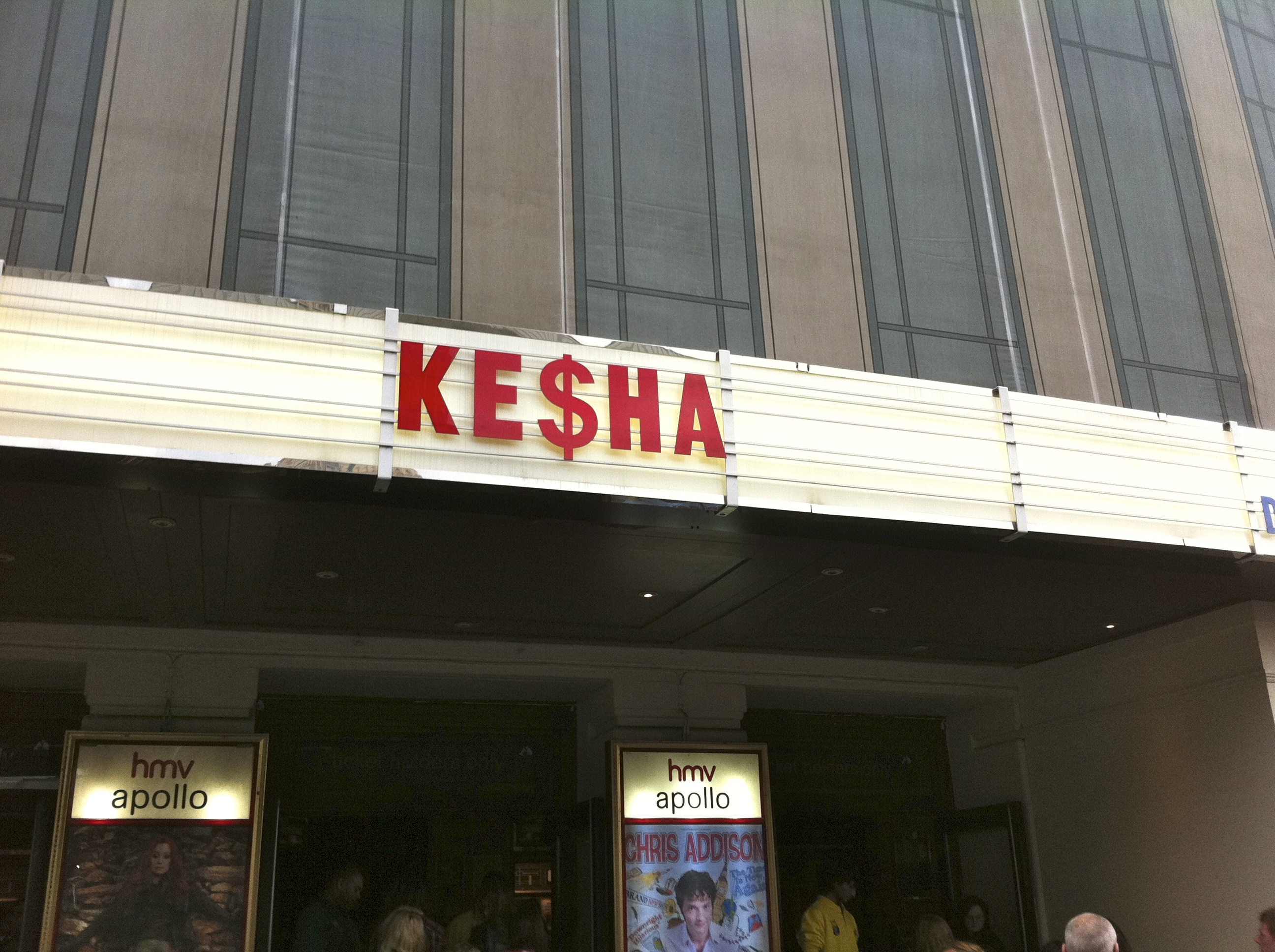
Hammersmith Apollo's marquee announcing Kesha's concert in London

List of 2011 concerts
Date	City	Country	Venue
February 15, 2011	Portland	United States	Roseland Theater
February 16, 2011	Seattle	United States	Showbox SoDo
February 18, 2011	Salt Lake City	United States	The Great Saltair
February 19, 2011	Denver	United States	Fillmore Auditorium
February 20, 2011	Kansas City	United States	The Midland by AMC
February 22, 2011	St. Louis	United States	Pageant Nightclub
February 24, 2011	Chicago	United States	House of Blues
February 25, 2011	Mount Pleasant	United States	McGuirk Arena
February 26, 2011	Detroit	United States	The Fillmore Detroit
March 3, 2011	Brisbane	Australia	Riverstage
March 5, 2011^{[A]}	Ascot	Australia	Doomben Racecourse
March 6, 2011^{[A]}	Joondalup	Australia	Arena Joondalup
March 7, 2011	Perth	Australia	Challenge Stadium
March 9, 2011	Melbourne	Australia	Festival Hall
March 10, 2011	Sydney	Australia	Hordern Pavilion
March 12, 2011^{[A]}	Randwick	Australia	Randwick Racecourse
March 13, 2011^{[A]}	Flemington	Australia	Flemington Racecourse
March 14, 2011^{[A]}	Adelaide	Australia	Rymill Park
March 16, 2011	Adelaide	Australia	Adelaide Entertainment Centre
April 3, 2011	Geneseo	United States	Kuhl Gymnasium
April 5, 2011	Fairborn	United States	Nutter Center
April 6, 2011	Toronto	Canada	Kool Haus
April 9, 2011	Glassboro	United States	Rowan University
April 12, 2011	Boston	United States	House of Blues
April 13, 2011	New York City	United States	Roseland Ballroom
April 15, 2011	Williamsport	United States	LC Recreation Center
April 16, 2011	Clarion	United States	Tippin Gym
April 19, 2011	Charlotte	United States	The Fillmore Charlotte
April 20, 2011	Atlanta	United States	Tabernacle
April 22, 2011	Orlando	United States	House of Blues
April 23, 2011	Orlando	United States	House of Blues
April 26, 2011	Dallas	United States	House of Blues
April 29, 2011	Houston	United States	Verizon Wireless Theater
April 30, 2011^{[B]}	Memphis	United States	Tom Lee Park
May 3, 2011	Reno	United States	Grand Sierra Theatre
May 4, 2011	San Francisco	United States	Warfield Theatre
May 6, 2011	Los Angeles	United States	Hollywood Palladium
May 7, 2011	Las Vegas	United States	Pearl Concert Theater
May 13, 2011^{[C]}	Chula Vista	United States	Cricket Wireless Amphitheatre
May 14, 2011^{[D]}	Los Angeles	United States	Staples Center
May 15, 2011^{[E]}	West Sacramento	United States	Raley Field
June 23, 2011^{[F]}	Pilton	England	Worthy Farm
June 24, 2011^{[F]}	Pilton	England	Worthy Farm
June 25, 2011	Budapest	Hungary	Felvonulási Square
June 28, 2011^{[G]}	Dublin	Ireland	The O_{2}
June 29, 2011^{[G]}	Belfast	Northern Ireland	Odyssey Arena
July 1, 2011^{[H]}	Rotselaar	Belgium	Werchter Festival Grounds
July 3, 2011	Birmingham	England	O_{2} Academy Birmingham
July 5, 2011	Oslo	Norway	Sentrum Scene
July 6, 2011^{[I]}	Karlskoga	Sweden	Putte I Parken Festival Grounds
July 9, 2011^{[J]}	Kinross	Scotland	Balado
July 11, 2011	Manchester	England	O_{2} Apollo Manchester
July 13, 2011	London	England	Hammersmith Apollo
July 24, 2011	Tulsa	United States	Brady Theater
July 26, 2011^{[K]}	Harrington	United States	Wilmington Trust Grandstand
July 28, 2011^{[L]}	Columbus	United States	Celeste Center
July 30, 2011	Duluth	United States	Arena at Gwinnett Center
July 31, 2011	Nashville	United States	Nashville Municipal Auditorium
August 2, 2011	The Woodlands	United States	Cynthia Woods Mitchell Pavilion
August 3, 2011	Cedar Park	United States	Cedar Park Center
August 4, 2011	Dallas	United States	Gexa Energy Pavilion
August 7, 2011	Miami	United States	Bayfront Park Amphitheater
August 9, 2011	Raleigh	United States	Raleigh Amphitheater
August 10, 2011	Charlotte	United States	Time Warner Cable Music Pavilion
August 12, 2011	Uncasville	United States	Mohegan Sun Arena
August 13, 2011^{[M]}	Saint-Jean-sur-Richelieu	Canada	Parc Pierre-Trahan
August 14, 2011	Toronto	Canada	Molson Amphitheatre
August 16, 2011	Boston	United States	Bank of America Pavilion
August 17, 2011	Philadelphia	United States	Festival Pier at Penn's Landing
August 19, 2011	Holmdel	United States	PNC Bank Arts Center
August 20, 2011	Wantagh	United States	Nikon at Jones Beach Theater
August 21, 2011	Fairfax	United States	Patriot Center
August 23, 2011^{[N]}	Indianapolis	United States	The Lawn at White River State Park
August 24, 2011	Chicago	United States	Charter One Pavilion
August 25, 2011^{[O]}	Mexico City	Mexico	National Auditorium
August 26, 2011	Clarkston	United States	DTE Energy Music Theatre
August 30, 2011	Saint Paul	United States	Roy Wilkins Auditorium
August 31, 2011	Council Bluffs	United States	Mid-America Center
September 2, 2011	Kansas City	United States	Starlight Theatre
September 3, 2011	Broomfield	United States	1stBank Center
September 6, 2011	Calgary	Canada	Scotiabank Saddledome
September 7, 2011	Edmonton	Canada	Rexall Place
September 9, 2011	Vancouver	Canada	Rogers Arena
September 10, 2011	Seattle	United States	WaMu Theater
September 11, 2011	Portland	United States	Theater of the Clouds
September 13, 2011	Davis	United States	The Pavilion
September 14, 2011	Oakland	United States	Fox Oakland Theatre
September 16, 2011	Las Vegas	United States	Aladdin Theatre for the Performing Arts
September 18, 2011	San Diego	United States	SDSU Open Air Theatre
September 20, 2011	Phoenix	United States	Comerica Theatre
September 28, 2011	São Paulo	Brazil	Via Funchal
September 29, 2011^{[P]}	Rio de Janeiro	Brazil	Parque Olímpico Cidade do Rock

^{A} These concerts were a part of "Future Music Festival".
^{B} This concert was a part of the Beale Street Music Festival
^{C} This concert was a part of the Channel 93.3 Summer Kickoff
^{D} This concert was a part of Wango Tango
^{E} This concert was a part of Endfest
^{F} This concert was a part of the Glastonbury Festival
^{G} These concerts were a part of Summerjam
^{H} This concert was a part of Rock Werchter
^{I} This concert was a part of the Putte i Parken Festival

^{J} This concert was a part of T in the Park
^{K} This concert was a part of the Wilmington Trust Grandstand Concert Series
^{L} This concert was a part of the Ohio State Fair
^{M} This concert was a part of the International Balloon Festival of Saint-Jean-sur-Richelieu
^{N} This concert was a part of the 1-800-Quit-Now Concert Series
^{O} This concert was a part of MTV World Stage Mexico
^{P} This concert was a part of Rock in Rio

Cancellations and rescheduled shows

March 22, 2011	Nagoya, Japan	Zepp Nagoya	Postponed
March 23, 2011	Osaka, Japan	Namba Hatch	Postponed
March 25, 2011	Tokyo, Japan	Studio Coast	Postponed
March 26, 2011	Tokyo, Japan	Zepp Tokyo	Postponed
March 29, 2011	Seoul, South Korea	Melon AX Hall	Postponed
April 25, 2011	Tulsa, Oklahoma	Brady Theater	Rescheduled for July 24, 2011
September 14, 2011	San Francisco	Bill Graham Civic Auditorium	Moved to the Fox Oakland Theatre in Oakland, California

=== Box office score data ===
Venue	City	Tickets sold / available	Gross revenue
Hordern Pavilion	Sydney	5,120 / 5,120 (100%)	$400,144
Nutter Center	Fairborn	5,077 / 5,141 (99%)	$337,804
Cedar Park Center	Cedar Park	4,472 / 4,708 (95%)	$202,813
Patriot Center	Fairfax	5,484 / 6,909 (79%)	$300,774
DTE Energy Music Theatre	Clarkston	13,495 / 13,495 (100%)	$770,368
Rexall Place	Edmonton	7,824 / 9,019 (87%)	$400,531
Theater of the Clouds	Portland	7,784 / 7,784 (100%)	$550,725
Fox Oakland Theatre	Oakland	2,472 / 2,800 (88%)	$202,477
Via Funchal	São Paulo	10,565 / 10,565 (100%)	$402,715
Total		62,293 / 65,541 (95%)	$3,568,351
