= Your Love Is My Drug =

2010 single by Kesha

Single by Kesha

from the album Animal
- Released: April 20, 2010
- Recorded: 2009
- Studio: Conway Recording Studios (Hollywood, CA); Dr. Luke's (New York, NY); Henson Recording Studios (Los Angeles, CA)
- Genre: Dance-pop; electropop
- Length: 3:06
- Label: RCA
- Songwriters: Kesha Sebert; Pebe Sebert; Joshua Coleman
- Producers: Dr. Luke; Benny Blanco; Ammo

Kesha singles chronology
"My First Kiss" (2010)	"Your Love Is My Drug" (2010)	"Take It Off" (2010)

Music video
- "Your Love Is My Drug" on YouTube

"Your Love Is My Drug" is a song by American singer-songwriter Kesha, taken from her first album, Animal (2010). It was released as the album's third single on April 20, 2010. The song was written by Kesha, Pebe Sebert and Ammo, who co-produced the song with Dr. Luke and Benny Blanco. Described by Kesha as a "pretty happy" song with dark undertones, the song's inspiration came from Kesha's relationship with an ex-boyfriend. Written about the couple's codependency, the song compares their love for one another to a drug.

Prior to the release of Animal, the song charted on the United States Billboard Hot 100, the United Kingdom Singles Chart, and Canadian Hot 100. After being released as a single the song reached the top five in Australia and the United States, as well as reaching the top ten in Canada and Ireland. It was certified 5× platinum by the Recording Industry Association of America (RIAA) for selling five million equivalent units in the United States.

Kesha notably performed the song alongside "Tik Tok" on the 35th season of Saturday Night Live where she was covered in glow-in-the-dark tribal-like make-up. In the psychedelic-influenced music video for the song, Kesha is featured in the desert, while being chased by a love interest. The video also features a digital animation sequence which was inspired by the Beatles' 1968 film Yellow Submarine.

== Writing and inspiration ==
"Your Love Is My Drug" was written by Kesha, alongside her mother Pebe Sebert and Joshua Coleman. The song was produced by Dr. Luke, Benny Blanco and Ammo. In an interview with MTV, Kesha stated the song was "written on an airplane, in like 10 minutes" and that the song had a carefree message; it is "stupid and fun" and not to be taken too seriously. When asked about the final line of the song ("I like your beard") and where it came from, Kesha explained, "I've always been into bearded dudes. Hello, I'm from Nashville, I'm into hillbillies... the redneck look is hot right now, and that's great for me. I'm over dudes trying to look like they're in boy bands." Kesha later elaborated explaining the song's inspiration,

"It's about me and my ex-boyfriend, and our tumultuous, psychotic relationship. We'd act weird, like drug addicts with each other, calling and seeing each other all the time. I was in love at the time, and (the song) sounds pretty happy, but it's a little bit of a dark song. You're so obsessed with somebody you start acting like a weirdo. ... I write about falling in love, being in love, breaking up because he's a loser, being heartbroken. I not only sing about getting rowdy, but love."

== Composition ==
"Your Love Is My Drug"
"Your Love Is My Drug" is composed in F♯ major and is layered with a heavy electronic backdrop.

"Your Love Is My Drug" is a mid-tempo dance-pop song combining Auto-Tune–processed vocals layered with a heavy electronic backdrop. Kesha opens the track singing, "Maybe I need some rehab / Or maybe just need some sleep / I've got a sick obsession, I'm seeing it in my dreams" while she depicts the tale of a teen love obsession. Her vocals throughout the song have been described as a shouty sing-speak style. Sara Anderson of AOL Radio called the song a "bubblegum track fused with '80s glam rock", with "Kesha's signature auto-tuned vocals and casual chatty ad-libs". Kesha ends the song saying, "Your love is my drug...I like your beard," which was inspired by her ideal man. The song is in common time with a moderate beat rate of 120 beats per minute. The song is set in the key of F♯ major and Kesha's vocal range spans from the note of C♯_{4} to the note of C♯_{5}.

== Critical reception ==
Fraser McAlpine from BBC complimented the song and Kesha for knowing her way around a strong pop chorus, giving the single four out of five stars. McAlpine noted that "some evidence of range would be welcomed at this point,[...] [since] there's a whole other side to her that you'd never know if you just listened to the singles" commenting that her persona was the "boozy floozy card" and that the power ballads on her album could have been better for a release. He went on to conclude "even though her 'act' is to be far too revealing about her dirty habits, she has still managed to create something of a mystique cloud around herself". Billboard magazine's Monica Herrera was impressed with the song, calling it "blissful". She went on to compliment the song for its strong chorus that has the ability to "stick with the listener for days". Sara Anderson of AOL Radio called the song "a playful take on a teen love obsession", complimenting "Kesha's signature auto-tuned vocals and casual chatty ad-libs". Anderson commented on the chorus of the song calling it "a modern Cyndi Lauper-inspired chorus". Nate Adams of No Ripcord was positive in his review of the song, calling it "a fun little disco tune", and wrote that the singer "isn't reinventing the wheel by any stretch of the imagination, but she has her share of catchy would-be hits."

Robert Copsey of Digital Spy gave the song four out of five stars, commenting that although she sings through the verses in her "usual speak-sing fashion", the chorus is "joyously irresistible". He also brands the song a "bubblegum electro stomper" adding that the song distinguishes itself from her previous singles writing that it manages to "put some distance between the singer and the novelty sound of her previous hits, while still being the fun, trashy and frankly quite filthy".

== Commercial performance ==
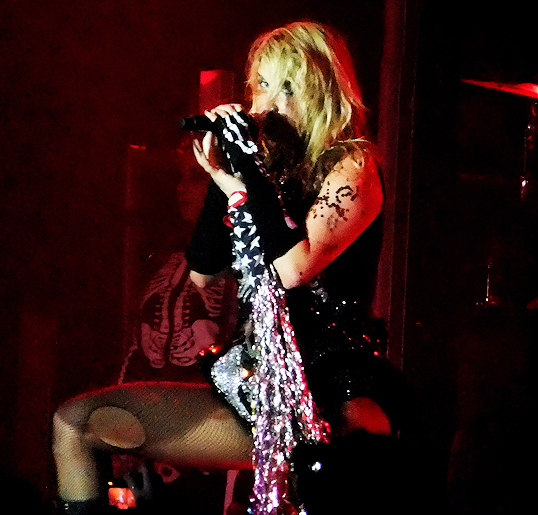
Kesha performing "Your Love Is My Drug" during her Get Sleazy Tour.

In January 2010, due to strong digital sales, the song charted on Canadian Hot 100, the United States Billboard Hot 100, and the United Kingdom Singles Chart, debuting at numbers 48, 27, and 63 respectively. In the United States the song was listed for six weeks before dropping off to re-enter at 91 on the week of April 3, 2010. After weeks of steadily ascending the charts the single reached a peak of four where it was listed for two weeks. The charting gave her her third straight top-ten hit in the country. On June 9, 2010, "Your Love Is My Drug" reached the number one position on the Billboard's Pop Songs chart, making Kesha the fifth female artist since the beginning of 2000, and the third in the last two years, to earn at least two number ones from a debut album. "Your Love Is My Drug" also peaked at number one on Billboard's Hot Dance Club Songs where it stayed for one week. As of March 2016, "Your Love Is My Drug" had sold 3.3 million digital copies. In 2024, the song had been certified 5× platinum by the Recording Industry Association of America (RIAA) for sales of 5 million equivalent units.

In Canada, the song spent a total of six weeks on the chart before dropping off to re-enter at 98. After steadily ascending the charts, the song moved up to reach a peak of six. The single fell the following week to the number seven position where it stayed for two weeks. In the succeeding week the song rose to the number six position where it stayed for an additional three weeks. The song entered at number 63 on the UK Singles Chart, dropping off the chart the following week. The single re-entered the chart on the week of May 16, 2010, at 60. On June 19, 2010, after four weeks of the single climbing the chart, it reached a new peak of 13. "Your Love Is My Drug" has spent more weeks in the UK top 20 than its higher charting predecessor "Blah Blah Blah" (featuring 3OH!3). In New Zealand the song debuted at number 29 on the Official Top 40 Singles chart, reaching its peak position of number 15 on its sixth week. The single entered the ARIA Charts at number 25. The following week, the single moved up to 17. As of the June 6, 2010 edition the song has reached a peak of three. It has since been certified Platinum by the Australian Recording Industry Association (ARIA) for shipments of 70,000 units.

== Music video ==
=== Background and development ===
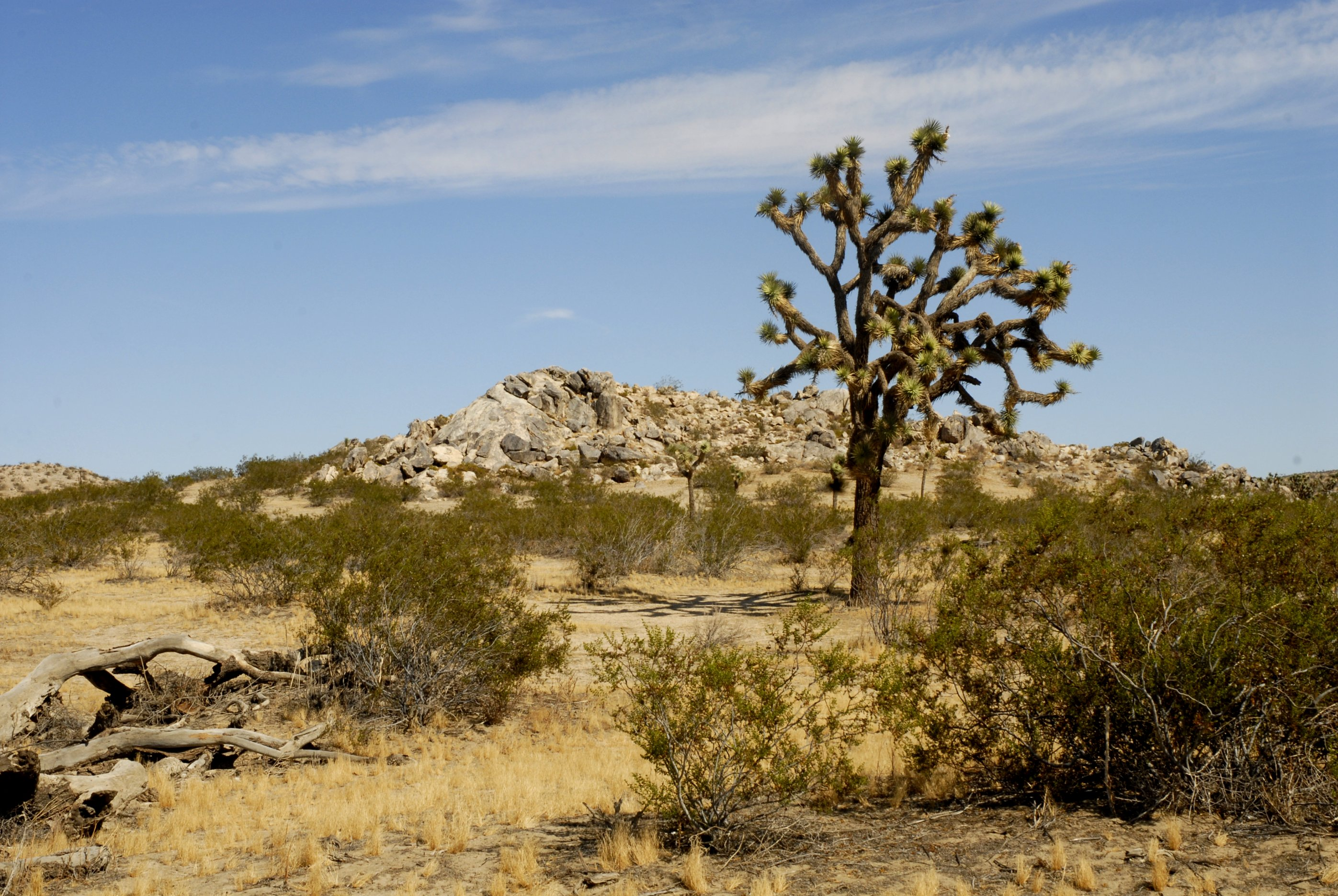
An image of the California desert near Lancaster, where the video was initially filmed (left) and Kesha (right) seen in the digital animation sequence of the video, this was inspired by The Beatles' 1968 film Yellow Submarine.

The music video for the song was directed by Honey and it was shot on April 6 and April 7, 2010, in the Lancaster, California desert. It premiered on Vevo at 12:01 a.m. on May 13, 2010. Kesha described the concept behind the video in an interview with MTV, stating, "I wanted it to be like a psychedelic trip of the mind, comparable with being so disgustingly in love with someone that you lose your head." She chose to also incorporate an animal aspect to the video explaining that she was "a huge animal lover". Kesha elaborated on the experience, "I also ride an elephant — no big deal! — and, um, I dance around a cave with black-light body paint and a python. I was in a cave, in the desert, and it was really fun." When asked about the inspiration for the video, she said "This video was inspired by the Beatles' Yellow Submarine movie, the animation aspect. There's a little bit of [that] in there too". The animated sequence of the video was directed by animator Lizzi Akana with assistance by Leah Shore. RCA hired Akana based on her work on MGMT's "Kids" music video. Akana drew inspiration from artists such as Peter Max, Alan Aldridge and Moebius. Her love interest in the clip was portrayed by Marc-Edouard Leon, a member of the directing team Skinny.

=== Synopsis and reception ===
The video begins with Kesha waking up next to her love interest; she then proceeds to run away while being chased by the man. Kesha walks through the desert while split scenes of her are shown where she is riding an elephant and wearing a tiger mask while crawling around in the sand. They are later seen on a boat singing and pretending to row while digitally animated water is added. It then cuts to a scene of all animation in which Kesha is portrayed as a mermaid. The mermaid and the man share a kiss; the video then jumps to a scene on a rocky hillside with Kesha walking around the sand with the man standing above on a rock. The video then cuts to another scene where Kesha is covered in glow in the dark body paint while dancing around in a cave with a python around her neck. The video ends with Kesha and her lover sitting around a campfire while still in the desert.

James Montgomery from MTV said that "Your Love Is My Drug" was a "supremely catchy pop tune" and that the video was "the perfectly blissed-out accompaniment." Montgomery chided the video for "not making much sense" but noted "that hardly matters" as "Kesha has stumbled on a perfect formula for pop success: Don't think too big, or too much. Sometimes an elephant ride is just an elephant ride". His conclusion of the video and of Kesha herself was, "It's a lot harder than you'd think to make something seem this effortless. Like I said, you can accuse Kesha of many things — but don't ever say she's not smart."

== Live performances ==
This song was performed on a season 35 episode Saturday Night Live hosted by Ryan Phillippe on April 17, 2010. During the performance, Kesha was covered in tribal-like make-up and performed in the dark with only black light lighting, making the make-up glow in the dark. On May 29, 2010, Kesha performed "Your Love Is My Drug" alongside previous single "Tik Tok" at the MTV Video Music Awards Japan. She also performed the song in a set for BBC Radio 1's Big Weekend. On August 13, 2010, Kesha performed "Your Love Is My Drug" on NBC's Today.

== Track listings ==
- Australian CD
1. "Your Love Is My Drug" – 3:06
2. "Your Love Is My Drug" (instrumental) – 3:06
- Germany and UK digital download
1. "Your Love Is My Drug" – 3:06
2. "Your Love Is My Drug" (Dave Audé radio) – 3:49
- UK digital download (EP)
1. "Your Love Is My Drug" – 3:06
2. "Your Love Is My Drug" (Dave Audé radio) – 3:49
3. "Your Love Is My Drug" (Bimbo Jones radio) – 3:07
4. "Your Love Is My Drug" (music video) – 3:28

== Credits and personnel ==
- Songwriting – Kesha Sebert, Pebe Serbert, Joshua Coleman
- Production – Dr. Luke, Benny Blanco, Ammo
- Instruments and programming – Dr. Luke, Benny Blanco, Ammo
- Vocal Editing – Emily Wright
- Recording – Vanessa Silberman, Megan Dennis, Becky Scott
- Engineering – Emily Wright, Matt Beckley

== Charts ==
=== Weekly ===
Weekly chart performance for "Your Love Is My Drug"
Chart (2010)	Peak position
Australia (ARIA)	3
Austria (Ö3 Austria Top 40)	12
Belgium (Ultratop 50 Flanders)	27
Belgium (Ultratip Bubbling Under Wallonia)	2
Canada Hot 100 (Billboard)	6
Canada CHR/Top 40 (Billboard)	2
Canada Hot AC (Billboard)	2
CIS Airplay (TopHit)	78
Croatia International Airplay (HRT)	34
Czech Republic Airplay (ČNS IFPI)	21
Denmark (Tracklisten)	34
Europe (Euro Digital Songs)	13
European Hot 100 Singles (Billboard)	34
France (SNEP) Download Charts	38
Germany (GfK)	19
Global Dance Songs (Billboard)	11
Hungary (Rádiós Top 40)	7
Ireland (IRMA)	10
Italy Airplay (EarOne)	75
Italy (FIMI)	31
Japan Hot 100 (Billboard)	33
Japan Adult Contemporary (Billboard)	32
Lithuania (European Hit Radio)	31
Mexico Airplay (Billboard)	12
Mexico Ingles Airplay (Billboard)	2
Netherlands (Dutch Top 40)	22
Netherlands (Single Top 100)	51
New Zealand (Recorded Music NZ)	15
Poland (Polish Airplay New)	3
Russia Airplay (TopHit)	88
Scottish Singles Sales (Official Charts)	11
Spain (Promusicae)	23
Spain Airplay Chart (PROMUSICAE)	10
Slovakia Airplay (ČNS IFPI)	9
South Korea (Circle)	140
South Korea Foreign (Circle)	12
Switzerland (Schweizer Hitparade)	34
UK Singles (Official Charts)	13
Ukraine Airplay (TopHit)	40
US Billboard Hot 100	4
US Adult Pop Airplay (Billboard)	17
US Dance Club Songs (Billboard)	1
US Dance Airplay (Billboard)	6
US Latin Pop Airplay (Billboard)	34
US Pop Airplay (Billboard)	1
US Rhythmic Airplay (Billboard)	7

=== Year-end ===
Year-end chart performance for "Your Love Is My Drug"
Chart (2010)	Position
Australia (ARIA)	51
Canada Hot 100 (Billboard)	23
Croatia International Airplay (HRT)	82
Hungary (Rádiós Top 100)	72
South Korea Foreign (Circle)	79
South Korea Foreign Downloads (Circle)	66
UK Singles (Official Charts)	120
US Billboard Hot 100	28
US Dance Club Songs (Billboard)	32
US Pop Airplay (Billboard)	13
US Radio Songs (Billboard)	29
US Rhythmic Airplay (Billboard)	44

== Certifications and sales ==
Certifications and sales for "Your Love Is My Drug"
Region	Certification	Certified units/sales
Australia (ARIA)	3× Platinum	210,000^{‡}
New Zealand (RMNZ)	Platinum	30,000^{‡}
South Korea	—	193,471
Sweden (GLF)	Gold	20,000^{‡}
United Kingdom (BPI)	Platinum	600,000^{‡}
United States (RIAA)	5× Platinum	5,000,000^{‡}
^{‡} Sales+streaming figures based on certification alone.

== Release history ==
"Your Love Is My Drug" release history
Region	Date	Format	Ref.
United States	April 20, 2010	Contemporary hit radio	
South Korea	May 14, 2010	Digital download	
Australia	May 21, 2010	CD	
United Kingdom	June 6, 2010	Digital download	
United Kingdom	June 6, 2010	Digital download (EP)	
