= List of songs written by Pebe Sebert =

Pebe Sebert is an American singer, songwriter, and multi-instrumentalist who is known for writing the number one single "Old Flames Can't Hold a Candle to You" by Dolly Parton and also writing many songs with her daughter Kesha. Sebert has also written songs for Miranda Cosgrove, Miley Cyrus, Pitbull, School Gyrls, Riders in the Sky, and Joe Sun.

== Songs ==
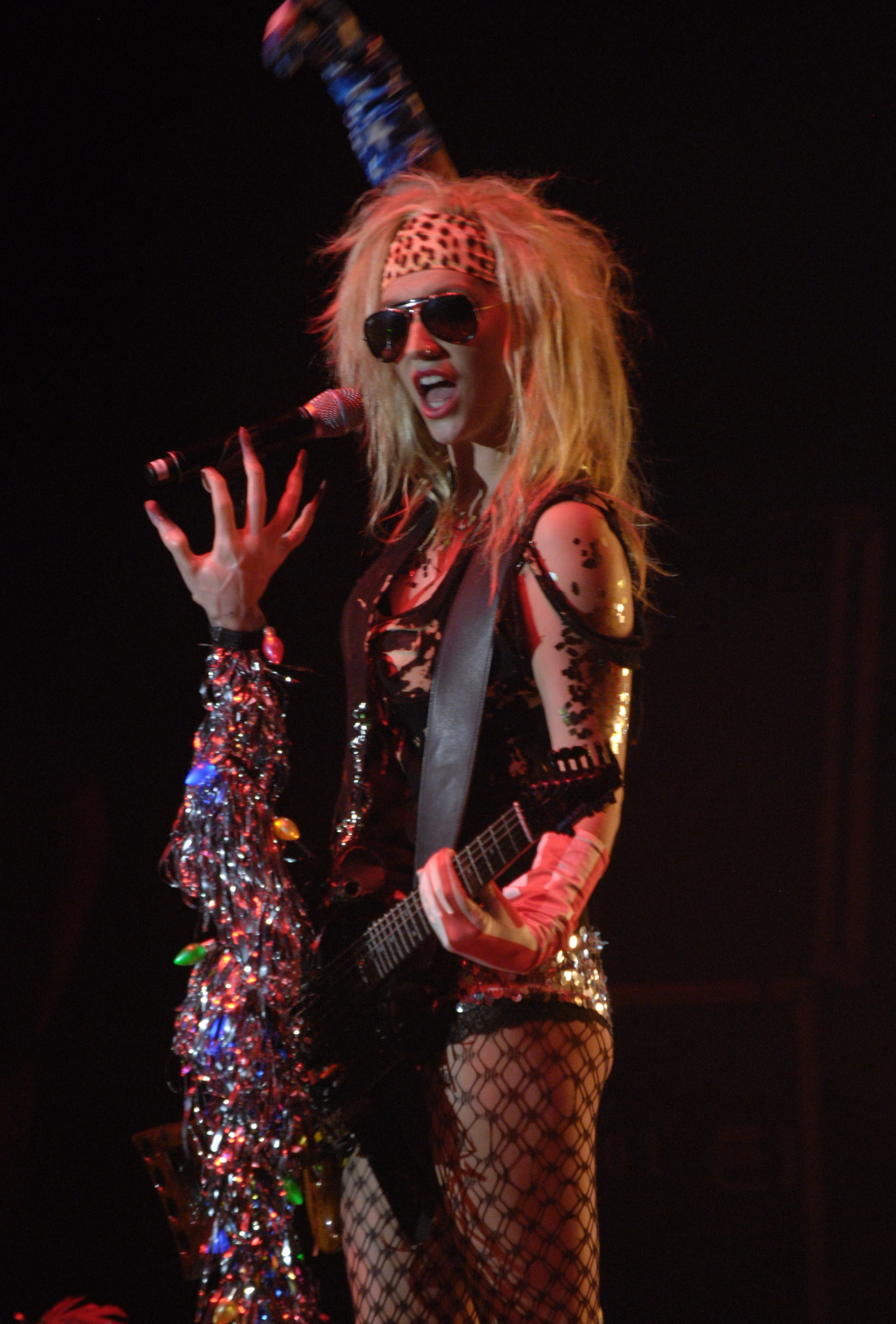
Sebert has written sixteen songs with her daughter Kesha for Kesha's albums

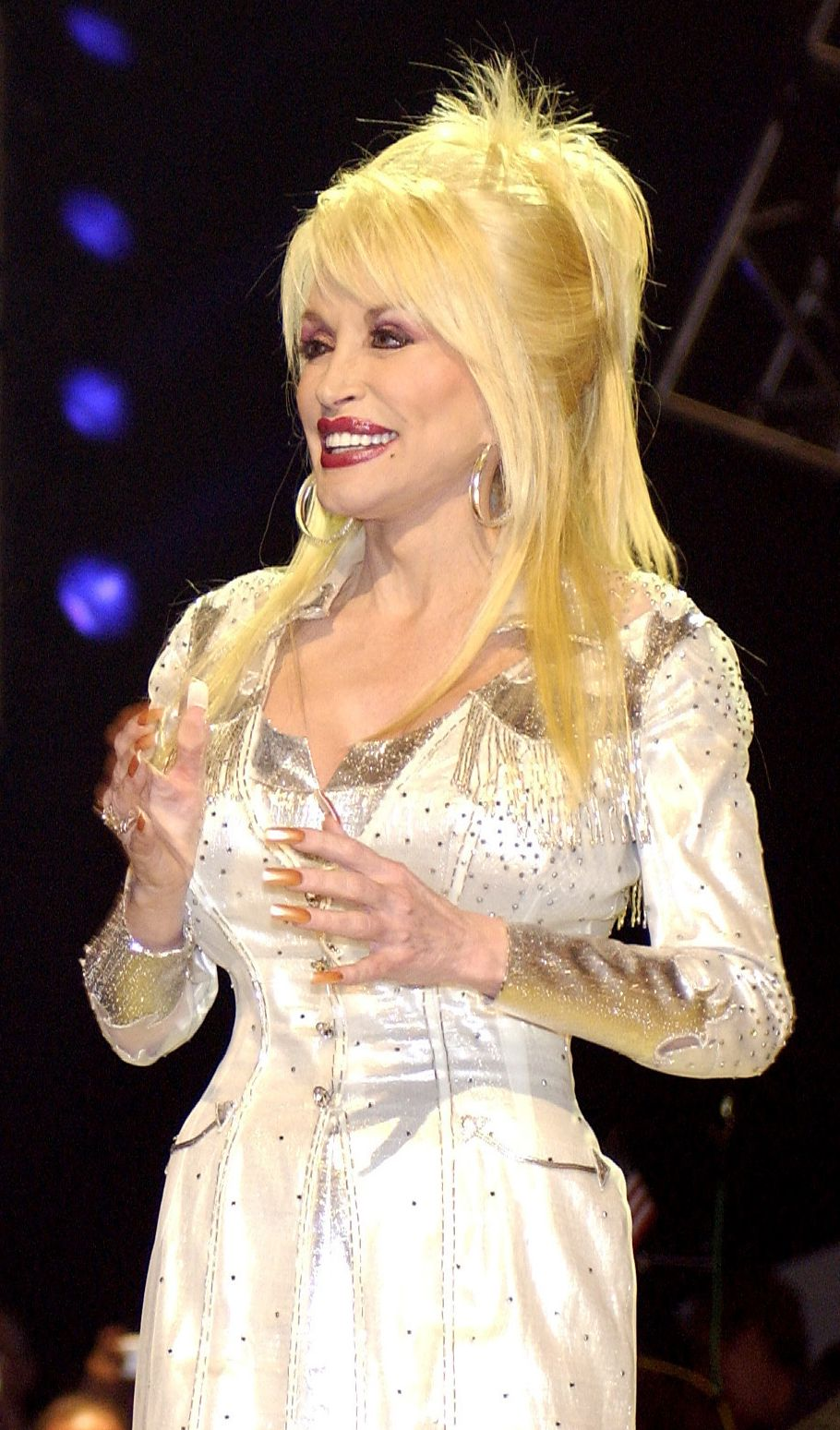
Sebert wrote Dolly Parton's number one single "Old Flames Can't Hold a Candle to You"

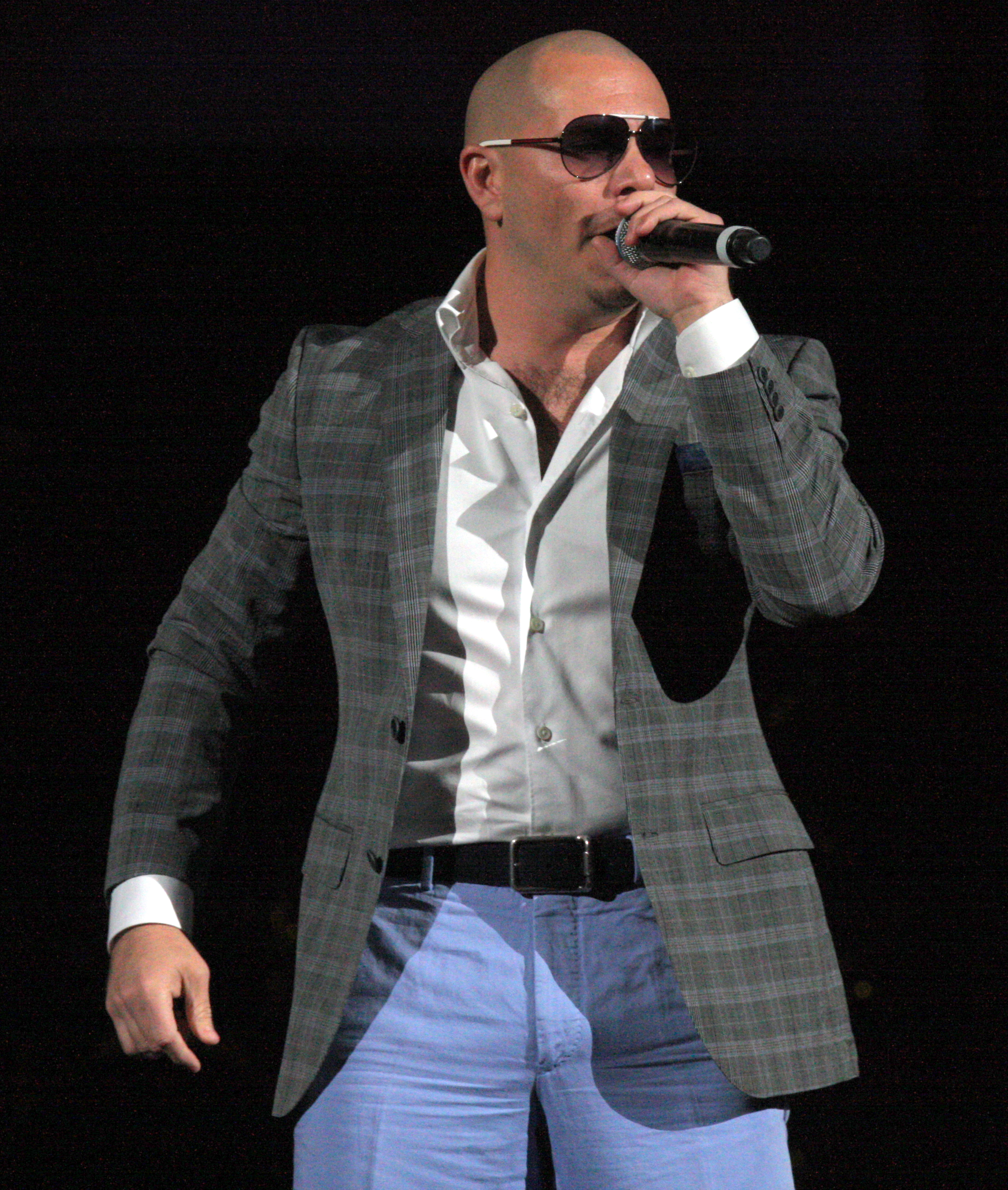
Sebert wrote Pitbull's number one single "Timber" which features her daughter Kesha who also co-wrote it.

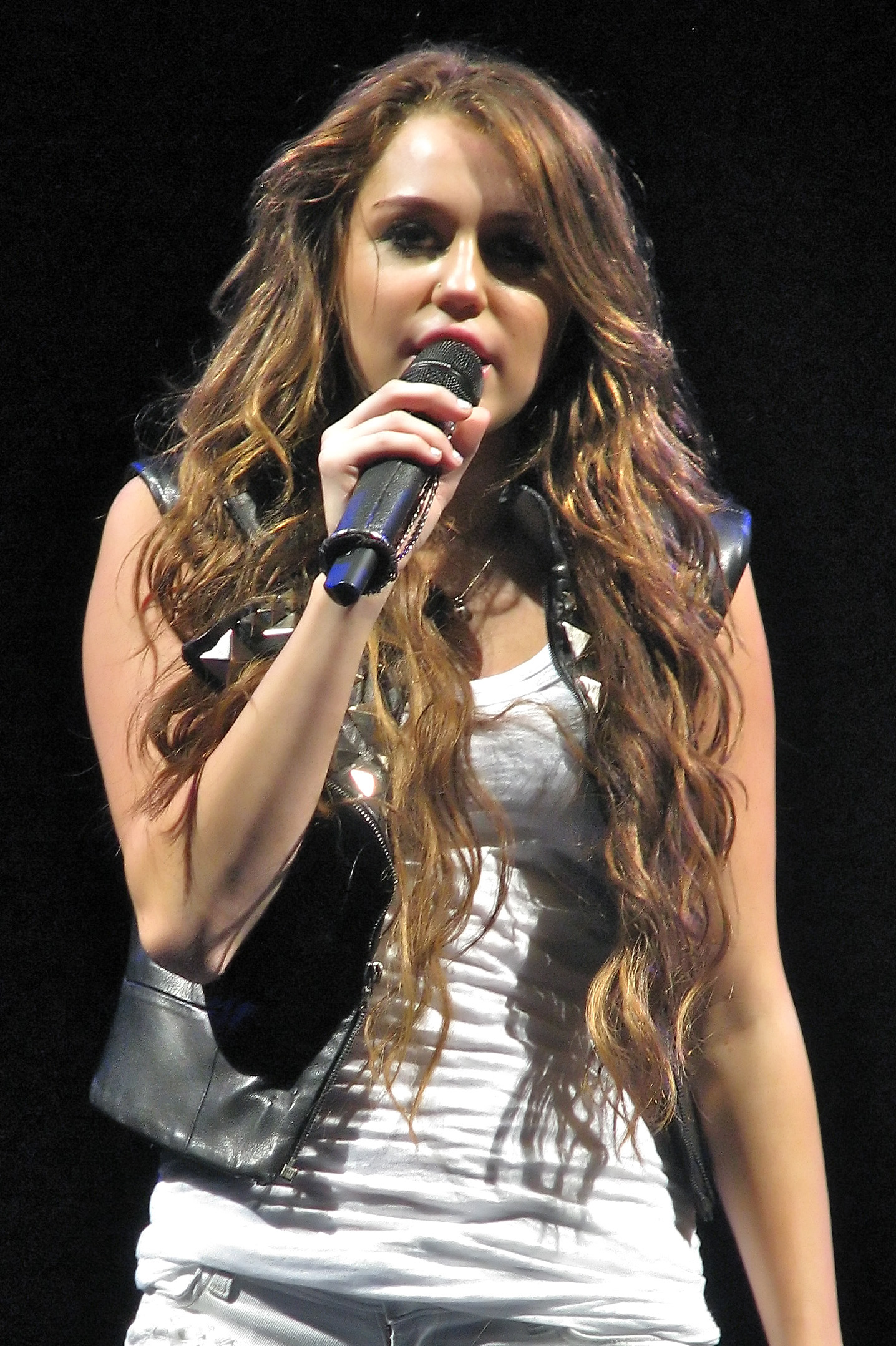
Sebert wrote the song "Time of Our Lives" for Miley Cyrus' debut extended play of the same name.

Key
| † | Indicates single release |
| # | Indicates promotional single release |

| Song | Artist(s) | Co-writer(s) | Album | Year | Ref. |
|---|---|---|---|---|---|
| "Animal" | Kesha | Kesha Sebert; Lukasz Gottwald; Greg Kurstin | Animal | 2010 | |
| "BFF" | Kesha; Wrabel | Kesha Sebert; Stuart Crichton; Stephen Wrabel | High Road | 2020 | |
| "Boogie Feet" | Kesha ft. Eagles of Death Metal | Kesha Sebert; Drew Pearson | Rainbow | 2017 | |
| "Borderline" | Katy Moffatt | John Fitzgerald; Pat Hubbard | Walkin' on the Moon | 1976 | |
| "Cannibal" # | Kesha | Kesha Sebert; Joshua Coleman; Mathieu Jomphe | Cannibal | 2010 | |
| "Complete" | Laura Turner | Anne Graham | Soul Deep | 2003 | |
| "Count on Me" | Phoenix Stone | Phoenix Stone | Phoenix Stone | 2000 | |
| "Crazy Beautiful Life" | Kesha | Kesha Sebert; Max Martin; Lukasz Gottwald | Cannibal | 2010 | |
| "Dirty Love" | Kesha | Kesha Sebert; Lukasz Gottwald; Iggy Pop; Matt Squire; Henry Walter | Warrior | 2012 | |
| "Disgusting" | Miranda Cosgrove | Kesha Sebert; Tom Meredith; Sheppard Solomon | Sparks Fly | 2010 | |
| "Eat the Acid" | Kesha | Kesha Sebert; Stuart Crichton | Gag Order | 2023 | |
| "Family Reunion" | Rick Trevino | John Scott Sherrill | Looking for the Light | 1996 | |
| "Fine Line" | Kesha | Kesha Sebert; Ajay Bhattacharyya | Gag Order | 2023 | |
| "Godzilla" | Kesha | Claire Wilkinson; Nathan Chapman | Rainbow | 2017 | |
| "Gold Trans Am" | Kesha | Kesha Sebert; Lukasz Gottwald; Allan Grigg; Henry Walter | Warrior | 2012 | |
| "Good Girl" | Jill Johnson | Ashley Mann Wilson | Discography | 2009 | |
| "Hymn" | Kesha | Kesha Sebert; Cara Salimando; Eric Frederic; Jonny Price | Rainbow | 2017 | |
| "I Will Be There For You" | Lyza Wilson | Mark Mangold | Lyza Wilson | 2004 | |
| "If I Was An Angel" | Monty Lane Allen | Mark Mangold | If I Was An Angel | 2004 | |
| "Learn to Let Go" † | Kesha | Kesha Sebert; Stuart Crichton | Rainbow | 2017 | |
| "Little Fool Hearted Me" | The Roys | Lee Roy | The Roys | 2006 | |
| "Love Forever" | Kesha | Kesha Sebert; Stuart Crichton | Period | 2025 | |
| "More Money" | Crystal Gayle | Benita Hill; Sandy Mason | The Ultimate Collection: Live | 2006 | |
| "No Boys Allowed" | Emily White | Laurie Webb | Emily White | Unknown | |
| "Old Flames Can't Hold a Candle to You" † | Dolly Parton | Hugh Moffatt | Dolly, Dolly, Dolly | 1980 | |
| "Old Flames Can't Hold a Candle to You" | Kesha ft. Dolly Parton | Hugh Moffatt | Rainbow | 2017 | |
| "Out Alive" | Kesha | Kesha; Joshua Coleman; Mathieu Jomphe | Warrior | 2012 | |
| "Party Bag" | School Gyrls | Michael Mani; Jordan Omley | A Very School Gyrls Holla-Day | 2010 | |
| "Potato Song (Cuz I Want To)" | Kesha | Kesha Sebert; Stuart Crichton | High Road | 2020 | |
| "Rich, White, Straight Men" | Kesha | Kesha Sebert; Stephen Wrabel; Stuart Crichton | Non-album promotional single | 2019 | |
| "Right Plan, Wrong Man" | Regina Regina | Bill Douglas | Regina Regina | 1997 | |
| "Safe" † | Sage featuring Kesha and Chika | Louie Sebert; Kesha Sebert; Drew Pearson; Chika | Non-album single | 2018 | |
| "Shadow" | Kesha | Kesha Sebert; Andrew Pearson | High Road | 2020 | |
| "Someone Is Falling in Love" † | Kathy Mattea | none | Kathy Mattea | 1984 | |
| "Something to Believe In" | Kesha | Kesha Sebert; Stuart Crichton | Gag Order | 2023 | |
| "Spaceship" | Kesha | Kesha Sebert; Drew Pearson | Rainbow | 2017 | |
| "Stephen" | Kesha | Kesha Sebert; Oliver Leiber; David Gamson | Animal | 2010 | |
| "There Goes the Neighborhood" | Larry Stewart | Bob DiPiero; John Scott Sherrill | Why Can't You | 1996 | |
| "There You Go" | The Roys | Lee Roy | The Roys | 2006 | |
| "Timber" † | Pitbull & Kesha | Kesha Sebert; Lukasz Gottwald; Priscilla Hamilton; Armando C. Pérez; Jamie Sanderson; Breyan Stanley Isaac; Lee Oskar; Keri Oskar; Greg Errico | Meltdown | 2013 | |
| "Time of Our Lives" | Miley Cyrus | Kesha Sebert; Lukasz Gottwald; Claude Kelly | The Time of Our Lives | 2009 | |
| "Too Hard" | Kesha | Kesha Sebert; Stuart Crichton | Period | 2025 | |
| "Too Old to Remember" | D.W. James | Randi Michaels; Michele Vice | Jack of All Trades | 1996 | |
| "Trail of Tears" | Riders in the Sky | Lee Domann | New Trails | 1986 | |
| "Warrior" | Kesha | Kesha Sebert; Lukasz Gottwald; Max Martin | Warrior | 2012 | |
| "Wild Turkey" | Beccy Cole | None | Little Victories | 2003 | |
| "Wonderland" | Kesha | Kesha Sebert; Lukasz Gottwald; Max Martin; Henry Walter | Warrior | 2012 | |
| "Your Love Is My Drug" † | Kesha | Kesha; Joshua Coleman | Animal | 2010 | |
