= Vincent Haycock =

Filmmaker (born 1979)

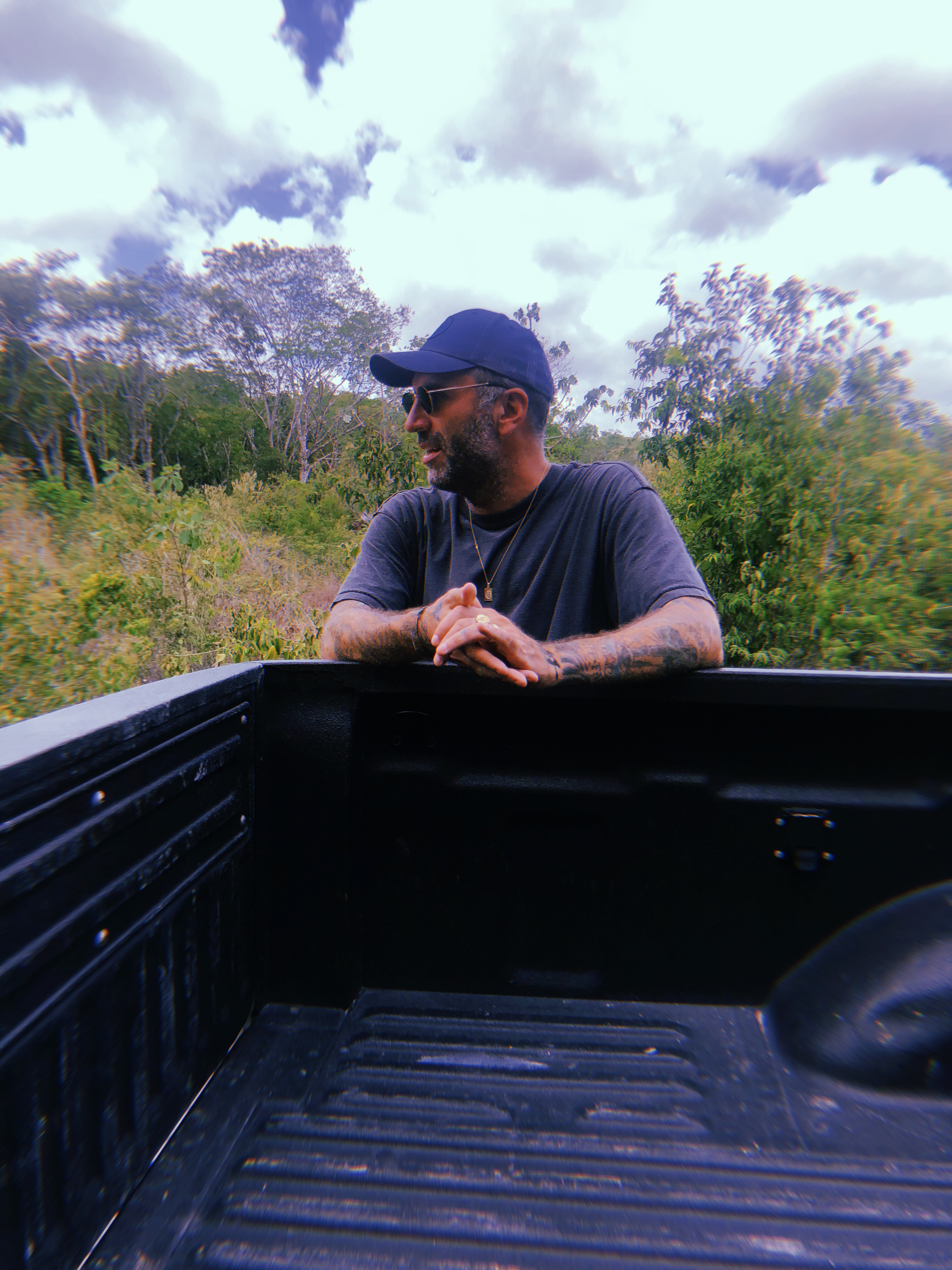
- Born: September 1, 1979 (age 46); Carmel, California, USA
- Occupations: Director, photographer

Vincent Haycock (born 1 September 1979) is an American director and photographer, known for his versatile work spanning music videos, commercials, and visual art projects. He has directed notable music videos for artists such as Dua Lipa's "Training Season", Leonard Cohen's "The Hills", U2's "Song for Someone", and Florence and the Machine's 49-minute visual album The Odyssey. His commercial work includes campaigns for Adidas, Instagram, and Volvo. In November 2023, Vincent collaborated with Los Angeles musician Maxo to create "Keep on Living," a multimedia installation exhibited in Berlin.

== Biography ==
Haycock's early interest in filmmaking was sparked by a gift from his mother, a VHS camcorder, which he used to make surf and skateboard videos as a teenager. This early interest led him to work in graphic design at Thrasher Magazine while he developed his skills in visual effects and editing. Haycock's early work in graphic design and visual effects included creating title sequences for notable productions such as "Fight Club" and "Nip/Tuck." For the latter, he received an Emmy Nomination in 2004.

== Filmography ==
=== Film ===
Year	Title	Notes
2010	Loved on Water	Short Film
2016	Florence + the Machine: The Odyssey	Visual Album
2016	Love Labyrinth	Short Film
2021	Zalando: Life of Liberty, starring Thomas Bo Larsen	Nominated Ciclope
2023	Instagram: Small Fries	Shortlist British Arrows
2023	Instagram: Send Off	

=== Music videos ===
Year	Title	Artist(s)	Notes
2006	Oh My	Mellowdrone	
2007	3 Words	Cheryl Cole ft. will.i.am	
2007	The Racing Rats	Editors	
2009	Flashback	Calvin Harris	
2009	Heartbreaker	MSTRKRFT	
2009	Black & Blue	Miike Snow	
2011	Bounce	Calvin Harris Feat. Kelis	
2011	Feel So Close	Calvin Harris	Award (won): MTV Video Music Award Best Dance Video of the Year
2012	I'm Getting Ready	Michael Kiwanuka	
2012	Let's Go	Calvin Harris Feat. Ne-Yo	
2012	Sweet Nothing	Calvin Harris Feat. Florence Welch	
2012	Lover to Lover	Florence + the Machine	Award (nominated): UK Music Video Award Best Alternative Video UK; UK Music Video Award: 2013 Best Cinematography
2012	Drinking from the Bottle	Calvin Harris Feat. Tinie Tempah	
2012	Build Me Up	Raffertie	
2013	Little Girl	Spiritualized	
2013	Thinking About You	Calvin Harris Feat. Ayah Marar	
2013	Pour It Up	Rihanna	
2014	West Coast	Lana Del Rey	
2014	Early Days	Paul McCartney	Award (nominated): Camerimage Best Cinematography
2015	Song for Someone	U2	
2015	How Big, How Blue, How Beautiful	Florence + the Machine	
2015	What Kind of Man	Florence + the Machine	Award (won): 2015 Camerimage Best Cinematography in a Music Video; Award Nominated 2015 Camerimage Best video Jury Award; Award Nominated: UK Music Video Award 2015 Best Rock/Indie Video
2015	St. Jude	Florence + the Machine	
2015	Ship to Wreck	Florence + the Machine	Award (nominated): UK Music Video Award Best Rock Video
2015	Queen of Peace & Long and Lost	Florence + the Machine	Award (nominated): UK Music Video Award 2015 Best Rock/Indie Video
2015	Delilah	Florence + the Machine	Award (won): UK Music Video Award Best Choreography in a Video, choreographer: Holly Blakey
2016	Third Eye	Florence + the Machine	
2016	The Odyssey	Florence + the Machine	Award (won): Ciclope Gold; Award (nominated): MTV Video Music Awards 2016 Breakthrough Long Form Video
2018	Shades of Blue	Kelsey Lu	
2018	Dead Boys	Sam Fender	Award (won): UK Music Video Award Best Rock Video – UK; Award (nominated): CICLOPE BEST MUSIC VIDEO CINEMATOGRAPHY
2019	Play God	Sam Fender	
2019	Hypersonic Missiles	Sam Fender	
2019	Will We Talk?	Sam Fender	
2019	Lights Up	Harry Styles	
2020	Foreign Car	Kelsey Lu	
2020	The Hills	Leonard Cohen	Award (nominated) Ciclope Best Music Video; ONEPOINTFOUR Flying High Award
2021	2023	Lila Drew	
2022	Used To	Lila Drew	
2022	Bad Juice	Lila Drew	
2022	48	MAXO	
2023	Free	MAXO	
2023	Living in My Head	Kesha	
2023	Happy	Kesha	
2023	Hate Me Harder	Kesha	
2023	Fine Line	Kesha	
2023	Eat the Acid	Kesha	
2023	Only Love Can Save Us Now	Kesha	
2024	Training Season	Dua Lipa	

=== Commercials ===
Year	Client	Title	Notes
2023	Adidas	A Thousand Back	
2023	Uber	Haircut	Part of Uber Teen Campaign
2023	Uber	In Love	Part of Uber Teen Campaign
2023	Uber	Tryouts	Part of Uber Teen Campaign
2023	Uber	Winner	Part of Uber Teen Campaign
2023	Uber	Braces	Part of Uber Teen Campaign
2023	Instagram	Small Fries	AICP awards, Best Campaign of the year. (Nominated) International Non-British Arrow, British Arrows (shortlist) Best Cinematography, British Arrows (shortlist) cinematographer: Alexis Zabé
2023	Instagram	Send Off	
2021	Volkswagen	Drive	
2021	Zalando	A Life of Liberty	
2020	Zalando	We Will Hug Again	Best Fashion Film. Ciclope (nominated)
2020	Deutsche Telekom	This Generation, starring Billie Eilish	
2020	Adobe	Special Delivery	
2019	Procter & Gamble	Kept Us Going	
2018	Duracell	Reconnected	
2018	Sonos	From Heartbreak to Healing	
2017	Volvo	The Get Away Car	
2017	American Airlines	Stand Up to Cancer	
2016	Pepsi	Mojo Concert	
2016	Pepsi	Mojo Backpackers	
2013	Modelo	The Real World	
2013	Modelo	The Boxer	
2013	Modelo	The Bar	
2013	Toyota	Let’s Go	
2013	Toyota	First Games	
2013	Toyota	Immaculate Reception	
2013	Toyota	Dream Teams	
2010	Ford F150	Rant - Benjamins	
2007	Infiniti	Uribe/Guerra	

== Individual Award Nominations ==
In additional to project-based awards and nominations, Haycock was nominated in the overall category of Best Director by UK Video Music Awards for 2015 NEWS: 2015 UK MVA Award Nominees and 2016 UK Music Video Awards 2016: here are the nominations... | News
