= Only Love Tour =

2023 concert tour by Kesha

- Tour by Kesha
- Promotional poster for the tour
- Location: North America
- Associated album: Gag Order
- Start date: October 15, 2023
- End date: November 26, 2023
- No. of shows: 26
- Supporting acts: Flyana Boss; Jake Wesley Rogers

Kesha concert chronology
- Kesha Live (2021); Only Love Tour (2023); House of Kesha (2024–25)

The Only Love Tour (originally dubbed the Gag Order Tour) was the sixth headlining concert tour by American singer Kesha, in support of her fifth studio album, Gag Order (2023). She announced the tour on May 30, 2023, with Jake Wesley Rogers as the supporting act. The tour began on October 15, 2023, at The Factory in Deep Ellum in Dallas, Texas and concluded on November 26 at Hard Rock Live Sacramento in Wheatland, California.

== Background ==
Since 2014, Kesha has been involved in a legal battle against her former producer and longtime collaborator, Dr. Luke, putting her career on hold. She released her final album under RCA Records and the Dr. Luke owned Kemosabe Records, Gag Order on May 19, 2023. The record saw Kesha dive into her more vulnerable side, as well as alluding to the lawsuit for the first time in her music. In June 2023, Kesha and Dr. Luke released a joint statement saying they have reached a settlement, about a month before the case was to go to trial.

Kesha described the tour to be a combination of joy, celebration, and moments of extreme, raw, vulnerability. The tour will also see performances of songs from her fourth album, High Road, as the coronavirus pandemic prevented Kesha from fully touring that album. Kesha also brought up the possibility of performing songs she isn't fond of. "There are definitely some songs that are not my favorites," she said to People magazine, "but I feel like I don't want to tell my fans that because if it's their number-one most favorite song, I don't want to kill the vibe. I also am open to, on this tour, playing some of the songs that are maybe not my favorites and creating new memories around them."

During a show in Boston, Kesha addressed the name change from the "Gag Order Tour" to the "Only Love Tour" by saying with all of life's difficulties, the only thing she could make sense of it all, referring to the lawsuit settlement, was love.

== Critical reception ==
Sophia Solano of The Washington Post gave a positive review of the October 29, 2023, show. She praised the maturity in Kesha's voice calling it "powerful". She notes that she is "free", referring to the lawsuit between the singer and Dr. Luke that lasted nearly a decade.

== Set list ==
This set list is from the show on October 15, 2023, in Dallas. It does not represent all concerts for the tour.

1. "Only Love Can Save Us Now"
2. "Tik Tok"
3. "Cannibal"
4. "Backstabber"
5. "Raising Hell"
6. "Take It Off"
7. "Good Old Days" (interlude)
8. "Eat the Acid"
9. "Till the World Ends"
10. "Hymn"
11. "Hate Me Harder"
12. "Ram Dass Interlude"
13. "Timber"
14. "Your Love Is My Drug"
15. "Die Young"
16. "Blow"

Encore

17. "Praying"
18. "We R Who We R"

=== Additional notes ===
- "Rainbow" was performed on select dates and would occasionally replace "Hymn".
- "Peace & Quiet" was performed on select dates.

== Tour dates ==
List of 2023 concerts
Date (2023)	City	Country	Venue	Opening act(s)
October 15	Dallas	United States	The Factory in Deep Ellum	Jake Wesley Rogers
October 16	Austin	United States	Moody Theater	Jake Wesley Rogers
October 18	New Orleans	United States	Orpheum Theater	Jake Wesley Rogers
October 20	Orlando	United States	Hard Rock Live	Jake Wesley Rogers
October 21	Atlanta	United States	The Eastern	Jake Wesley Rogers
October 23	Nashville	United States	Ryman Auditorium	Jake Wesley Rogers
October 24	Nashville	United States	Ryman Auditorium	Jake Wesley Rogers
October 26	Newport	United States	MegaCorp Pavilion	Jake Wesley Rogers
October 28	Ledyard	United States	Foxwoods Resort Casino	Jake Wesley Rogers
October 29	Washington, D.C.	United States	The Anthem	Jake Wesley Rogers
October 31	Philadelphia	United States	The Met	Jake Wesley Rogers
November 1	Boston	United States	MGM Music Hall	Jake Wesley Rogers
November 3	New York City	United States	Hammerstein Ballroom	Jake Wesley Rogers
November 4	New York City	United States	Hammerstein Ballroom	Jake Wesley Rogers
November 6	Toronto	Canada	History	Jake Wesley Rogers
November 7	Detroit	United States	Masonic Temple	Jake Wesley Rogers
November 9	Chicago	United States	Aragon Ballroom	Jake Wesley Rogers
November 11	Milwaukee	United States	The Rave/Eagles Club	Jake Wesley Rogers
November 12	Prior Lake	United States	Mystic Showroom	Jake Wesley Rogers
November 14	Denver	United States	Mission Ballroom	Jake Wesley Rogers
November 17	Oakland	United States	Fox Theatre	Jake Wesley Rogers
November 18	Los Angeles	United States	Hollywood Palladium	Jake Wesley Rogers
November 20	Anaheim	United States	House of Blues Anaheim	Jake Wesley Rogers
November 24	Las Vegas	United States	Pearl Concert Theater	Flyana Boss
November 25	Reno	United States	Grand Sierra Resort & Casino	Flyana Boss
November 26	Wheatland	United States	Hard Rock Live Sacramento	Flyana Boss
