= Backstabber =

Backstabber is a term used to refer to someone who betrays another. It may also refer to:

== Music ==
=== Albums ===
- Back Stabbers (album), a 1972 album by the O'Jays

=== Songs ===
- "Back Stabbers" (song), 1972 song by the O'Jays
- "Backstabber" (The Dresden Dolls song), a 2006 song by the Dresden Dolls
- "Backstabber" (Spunge song), a 2005 single by UK ska punk group Spunge
- "Backstabber", a song by English four piece rock band Ripchord
- "Backstabber", a song by Disciple from their 2005 album Disciple
- "Backstabber", a song by Eminem from his album Infinite
- "Backstabber" (Kesha song), a song by Kesha from her debut album Animal
- "Backstabber", a song by Krokus from their 1999 album Round 13

== See also ==
- "Backstabbers" (CSI: Miami episode)
- Backstabbers Incorporated, an American hardcore/metal band
- Backstab (magazine), a French games magazine
