= Till the World Ends =

2011 single by Britney Spears

Single by Britney Spears

from the album Femme Fatale
- Released: March 4, 2011
- Recorded: 2010
- Studio: Conway Recording, Los Angeles
- Genre: Dance-pop
- Length: 3:58
- Label: Jive
- Songwriters: Lukasz Gottwald; Alexander Kronlund; Max Martin; Kesha Sebert
- Producers: Dr. Luke; Max Martin; Billboard; Emily Wright

Britney Spears singles chronology
"Hold It Against Me" (2011)	"Till the World Ends" (2011)	"S&M" (remix) (2011)

Remix single cover
- The Femme Fatale remix featuring Nicki Minaj and Kesha cover

Music video
- "Till the World Ends" on YouTube

"Till the World Ends" is a song by American singer Britney Spears from her seventh studio album, Femme Fatale (2011). It was written by Kesha, Dr. Luke, Alexander Kronlund, and Max Martin, while the production was handled by Luke, Martin and Billboard. It was released as the second single from the album on March 4, 2011, by Jive Records. "Till the World Ends" is an uptempo dance-pop, electropop and Eurodance song with an electro beat. It opens with sirens, and has elements of trance. The song features a chant-like chorus, and lyrics in which Spears sings about dancing until the end of the world. "Till the World Ends" received universal acclaim from critics, who deemed it a catchy dance track and complimented its anthemic nature.

"Till the World Ends" was treated with different remixes, most notably the Femme Fatale Remix, featuring rapper Nicki Minaj and Kesha, which was released on April 25, 2011. The remix adds a rap verse by Minaj at the beginning, new vocals by Kesha, and a dubstep breakdown. The Femme Fatale Remix received positive reviews from critics, with most complimenting the diversity of the group and Minaj's rap. "Till the World Ends" attained international success, charted on the top-ten in several major music markets, including Australia, France, Ireland, New Zealand, Sweden and Switzerland. Spears's solo version reached number eight on the Billboard Hot 100. The Femme Fatale Remix propelled the single to the top five on the Canadian Hot 100 and the US Billboard Hot 100.

An accompanying music video for the "Till the World Ends" was released on April 6, 2011. It portrays Spears in an underground dance party set on December 21, 2012. Critics noted the similarities with the music video for "I'm a Slave 4 U" (2001), and predominantly gave positive reviews for it. A choreography cut was released on April 15, 2011. The video was also nominated for two categories at the 2011 MTV Video Music Awards, and went on to win Best Pop Video. Spears has performed "Till the World Ends" on television shows Good Morning America and Jimmy Kimmel Live!, and performed it with Minaj at the 2011 Billboard Music Awards. She has also performed the song as the encore of the Femme Fatale Tour (2011), Britney: Piece of Me (2013–2017), Britney: Live in Concert (2017) and Piece of Me Tour (2018).

== Background and release ==
"Till the World Ends" was written and produced by Dr. Luke and Max Martin, with additional writing by American recording artist Kesha and Alexander Kronlund, and additional production by Billboard. In an interview for Spin on February 11, 2011, Kesha announced she had co-written the song with Luke and Martin for Spears's then-upcoming album Femme Fatale, explaining it was inspired by "me imagining [Spears] and any female musician touring the world. When you go out, and you're having an amazing, magical night and you don't want to go to sleep and you want it to last until the world ends." She further elaborated for Vulture:

"I've never been more proud of anything in my career... It really solidifies me as a songwriter in the pop music world, which is what I consider myself first and foremost. So it actually is really, really exciting for me when I hear [Britney] sing it. Like, when I hear my own songs on the radio I have to kind of turn it down or change the radio or whatever. When I hear that, I fucking blow the speakers out and I order everybody to dance."

On March 2, 2011, the single's cover art, in which Spears appears sitting on a couch in a sweater and heels, was posted on Deezer. This was followed by a 30-second snippet of the song, which appeared on German Amazon. "Till the World Ends" leaked online on March 3, 2011, which prompted Spears to post hours later on her Twitter account, "Looks like the cat's out of the bag..." She formally premiered the single at On Air with Ryan Seacrest, on March 4, 2011, at 10:00 EST (15:00 UTC). "Till the World Ends" was made available on iTunes the same day, several days earlier than originally planned. Following the announcement, Kesha spoke to MTV News stating that "I consider myself a songwriter before and above everything else, so it's an honor to write for one of pop music's biggest icons." During an interview with Seacrest, Spears described "Till the World Ends" as "fun. I like it. It's good energy. [...] I'm a vibe person, and I think I love good-mood songs, and if it puts me in a good mood, it clicks for me."

== Composition ==
"Till the World Ends" (2011)
A 23-second sample of the song's chorus, which features Spears singing over an electro beat influenced by trance and Eurodance.

"Till the World Ends" is an uptempo dance-pop and electropop song, with an electro beat and elements of trance and Eurodance. The song opens with sirens and a "sizzling" bassline. Spears delivers confident and breathy vocals, in lyrics such as "If you want this good shit / Sicker than the remix / Baby let me blow your mind tonight." In the chorus, the song slows down while Spears sings "I can't take it take it take no more / Never felt like felt like this before / Come on get me get me on the floor / DJ what you what you waiting for?". The melody's 4:3 cross-rhythm continues into a chant-like segment, in which "whoa-oh-oh-oh" is repeated. The bit was compared by Scott Shettler of AOL to the "rapid word repetition" of Kesha. Keith Caulfield of Billboard said the chorus "comes on hard like it's the sexy spawn" of American recording artist Usher's "OMG" (2010) and Italian band Baltimora's "Tarzan Boy" (1985).

Gerrick Kennedy of the Los Angeles Times stated that like her previous single "Hold It Against Me", "Spears's main intention with her new single seems to be keeping the dance floor pulsating with sweaty bodies". Jason Lipshutz of Billboard said the song recalls past hits by English recording artist Taio Cruz, Swedish recording artist Robyn and Spanish recording artist Enrique Iglesias. Allison Stewart of The Washington Post felt the song was comparable to Iglesias' "Tonight (I'm Lovin' You)" (2010). Sal Cinquemani of Slant Magazine and a reviewer from Popjustice compared it to Kesha's "Blow" (2011). According to the sheet music published at Musicnotes.com by Kobalt Music Publishing Inc., "Till the World Ends" is set in the simple quadruple meter time signature, with a moderate dance beat infused metronome of 132 beats per minute. It is composed in the key of C minor; Spears' vocals range from the low-key of B♭_{3} to the high-note of C_{5}. Lyrically, the song talks about dancing until the end of the world.

== Critical reception ==
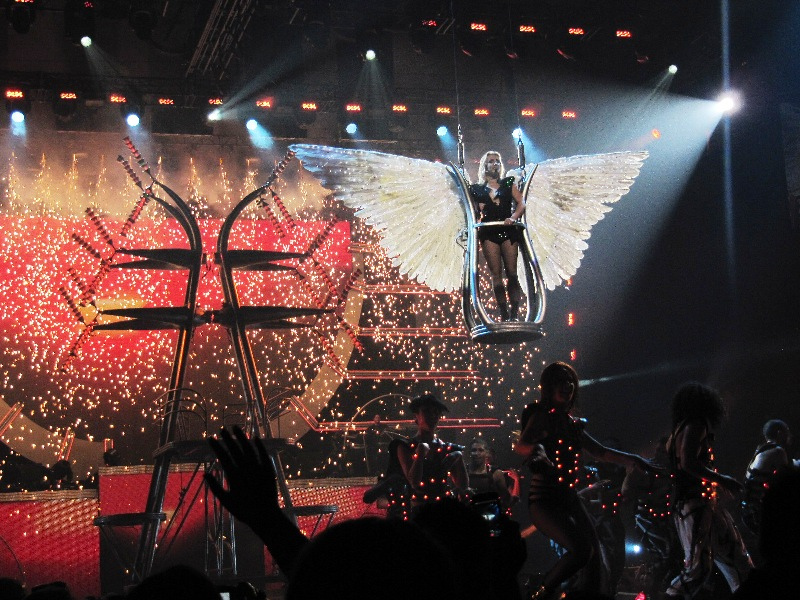
Spears flying over the audience during the performance of "Till the World Ends" at the Femme Fatale Tour

The song received universal acclaim from critics. Ryan Brockington of the New York Post called it "amazing". Jon Dolan of Rolling Stone gave the song three and a half out of five stars, stating, "You want a party song, call a partier" and describing it as "sky-sucking synth streaks, a beat that sounds like blimps fucking and a thousand shirtless drunken sailors chanting along on the chorus." Gerrick Kennedy of the Los Angeles Times called the song "catchy [...] [it] makes you want to grab some glow sticks and hit the clubs" and added that the Femme Fatale era "already shows an undeniably more confident Spears." Mike Collett-White of Reuters deemed it as a dance anthem. Robert Copsey of Digital Spy said that the song is unquestionably a Dr. Luke production, but "somehow it's Brit that manages to come out on top." Copsey went on to call it her most uplifting number since "Stronger" (2000), and added that "for longtime Britney fans, is the comeback we've all been waiting for.

Bill Lamb of About.com commented that the song would "sound solid on the radio and bring crowds to the dance floor," but when compared to "Hold It Against Me", it was much safer and not as innovative. Jed Gottlieb of the Boston Herald gave the song a B+, saying that "pop fans always need a huge hook, catchy chorus and break-it-down-build-it-up bridge. This song’s got all three". Edna Gundersen of USA Today called it "a sleek and impossibly catchy slab", and said that although the song is unmistakable Luke, Spears "holds her own with confident, kittenish vocals." Allison Stewart of The Washington Post stated that the track "is Spears's most joyously danceable track in a long time." Caryn Ganz of Spin named it "her first truly synapse-sizzling single since 'Toxic'." Andy Gill of The Independent selected the song along with "Criminal" as the download picks of the album. Kevin Ritchie of Now stated that "wannabe World Cup anthem 'Till The World Ends' kicks things off with an aura of pounding, Euro dance euphoria."

David Buchanan of Consequence of Sound commented that "Till the World Ends", "Hold It Against Me" and "Inside Out" "simultaneously send Spears back to basics vocally, and into 2011 sonically." Rudy Klapper of Sputnikmusic said that the song "throbs with trance-y synths, a thumping electro beat that is pure sex and a chorus that goes and goes as only the best club hits can do, sensible lyrics be damned." Evan Sawdey of PopMatters said that "Till the World Ends" sets the pace of Femme Fatale, while calling it "a stadium-rocking pop anthem." Keith Caulfield from Billboard said that the song has a "roof-shaking chant-chorus", but criticized the lyrics, saying that they have "been echoed incessantly over the past year in countless Hot 100 top ten hits: dance until you drop from exhaustion." Sal Cinquemani of Slant Magazine compared it to Kesha's "Blow", saying that the tracks "[are] so similar [...] that I can't decide which one I like more—or if I even like them at all." A reviewer from Popjustice also compared it to "Blow", but said "Till the World Ends" was not as good.

=== Recognition ===
Rolling Stone named "Till the World Ends" as the third best song of 2011. The writer concluded, "Brit[ney] delivers the Apocalypse Now of Eurotrash electrotrance disco songs, as that throbbing pulse builds to a pure drop-the-bomb chorus. And that 'whoa-ho-ho' choir sounds like Cher leading an aircraft carrier full of gay sailors." The song was also named as the third best single of 2011 by Billboard, and commented that it is "Britney's most immediate single since 'Toxic'." Sam Lansky of PopCrush considered "Till the World Ends" the best pop song of 2011, writing, "2011 was already Year of the Spears by January, when Britney Spears' 'Hold It Against Me' topped the charts — but [Britney] had something even better up her sleeve, the crackling dancefloor barnstormer 'Till the World Ends', penned by rowdy popstrel Kesha and produced by monster hitmaker Dr. Luke. It's a gargantuan party song with provocative lyrics (“This kitten got your tongue tied in knots”, anyone?), throbbing synths, and a thrillingly euphoric hands-in-the-air chant-along chorus — and there wasn't a more exuberant pop song this year." Digital Spy also considered the track as the best song of 2011, naming it "Britney's best track since 'Toxic'" and commenting, "judging from its chart position, it's also her most underrated hit." The Village Voice's Pazz & Jop annual critics' poll ranked "Till the World Ends" as the seventh best song of 2011, tied with Lana Del Rey's "Video Games". "Till the World Ends" was voted by readers as the Best Song of the 2010s on Billboard.

== Remixes ==
=== The Femme Fatale remix ===
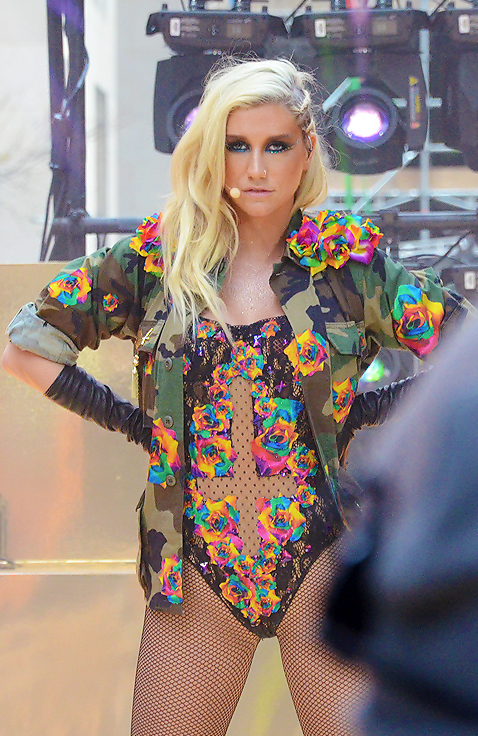
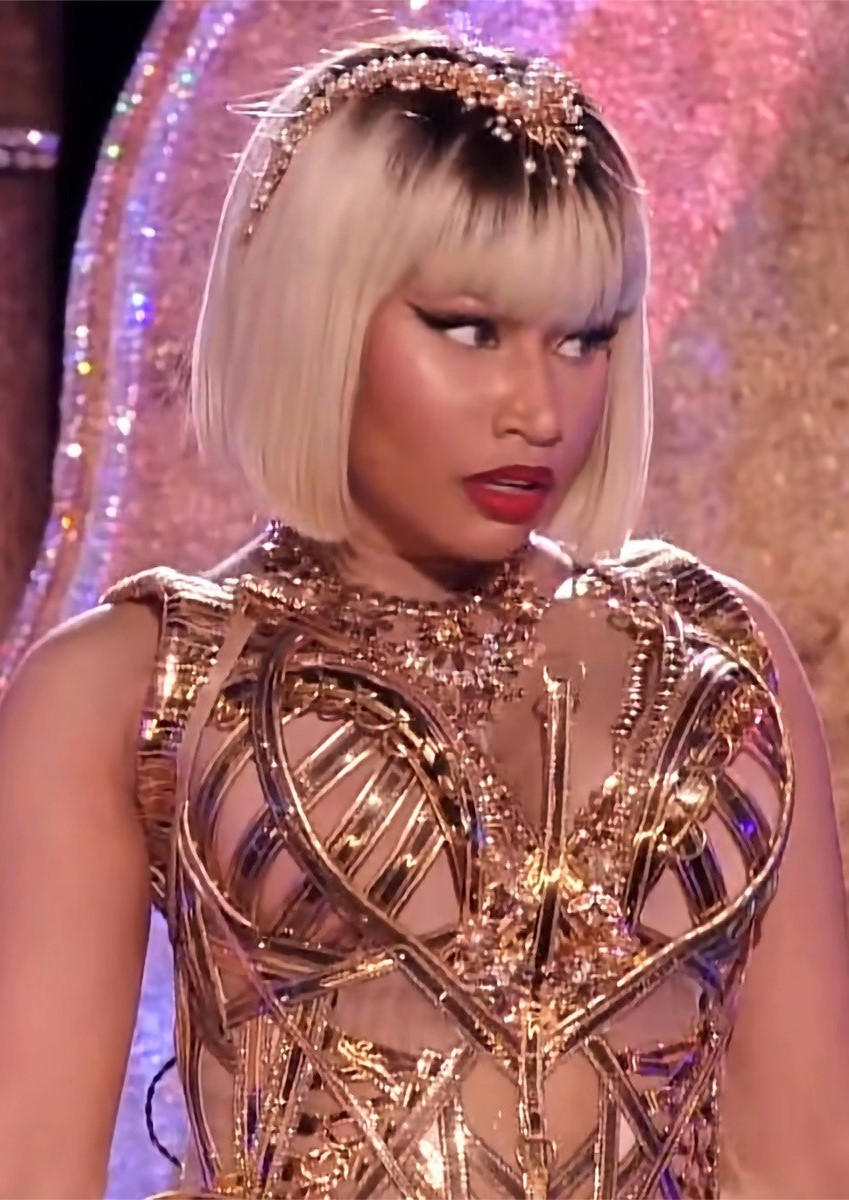
The Femme Fatale Remix features vocals by Kesha (left) and a rap verse by Nicki Minaj (right).

A remixed version of "Till the World Ends", featuring pop singer Kesha and rapper Nicki Minaj, was leaked online on April 22, 2011. The same day, three countdowns with lines of the song appeared on the official websites of Spears, Kesha and Minaj. The Femme Fatale Remix was released on iTunes on April 25, 2011. The same day, Spears uploaded a picture of the cover art to her Twitter account. Kesha told MTV News, "I'm a massive fan of both the ladies I share the track with. I wrote 'TTWE' for Britney [...] and she killed it and I loved it, but I just thought a supergroup of three hot, strong women could just take over the airwaves." The remix adds heavier bass during the beginning, and starts with Minaj rapping with intensity about a female hater, in lines such as "Told you they'd revive your career, but somebody lied/ I ain't talkin' poultry when I say this chicken's fried." This continues by Spears singing the first verse, after which Minaj says "It's Britney, bitch. I'm Nicki Minaj and that's Kesha!", and the first chorus is sung by the latter. Spears continues with the song and is accompanied by Kesha towards the end of the second verse and the bridge. The remix also features a dubstep breakdown, reminiscent of "Hold It Against Me".

Tina Hart of MSN UK stated that "[Minaj] maintain[s] her 'badass' demeanour. Britney's familiar tones greet you on the verse and Kesha sounds perfectly at home on the chorus." Wesley Case of The Baltimore Sun stated that while Spears sounds processed, "Minaj's larger-than-life performance matches the in-the-red party production" and Kesha "adds an extra layer of dirt-under-the-nails sheen." He summarized his review by saying that the remix "is the perfect example of pop's current love affair with Euro dance and add-it-all-to-the-pot rules." Jordan Zakarin of The Huffington Post commented the track "has enough star power to dwarf our own sun" and added that it "puts enough of a spin on the original version to make it worth a spin on its own." Samesame.com.au stated that Minaj's rap was "fantastic", and that although Kesha's verse was "a little strange", it also "works, but [...] further emphasises what a poor choice for single 'Till The World Ends' was in the first place, as the song sounds even more like a B-side to Kesha's Cannibal EP." Maura Johnston of The Village Voice highlighted the breakdown and Minaj "who seems particularly energized here, stretching and bending her voice like it's a Plasticman doll." Kyle Anderson of Entertainment Weekly said that "like most remixes, we'll stick with the original". Anderson also stated that Kesha's contribution is "generally ignorable" and that Minaj's rap does not flow well with the rest of the song. Pitchfork included the Femme Fatale Remix in their Top 100 Tracks of 2011 list, writing:

"'Till the World Ends' was already the best Britney single since 'Toxic', an ecstatic Euroclub floor-filler about wanting to dance until the world ends and other important matters. Then they added the Nicki Minaj verse. In her 45-second evisceration, Nicki manages to squeeze in chicken noises and the words 'poultry', 'Epsom salt', and 'Ricki Lake'-- not to mention the immortal diss 'Sniff, sniff, criiiies/ I done slayed your entire fucking liiiiife.' (Fact: In 2011, pretty much any song in the world could be made infinitely better by the addition of a Nicki Minaj verse.) Sprinkle a little bit of Kesha, the song's co-writer, on the chorus, and you've got a three-headed diva Hydra that sums up the recent changing of the femme pop guard from airbrushed and perfect to (relatively) weird and chaotic. It's the year's greatest quickie cash-in remix created to boost the chart position of a floundering single. Considering the ubiquity of the practice, that's saying something."

=== Other remixes ===
A Bollywood version of the song was done by Indian music producer duo Salim and Sulaiman Merchant, and released on DesiHits.com, a website for South Asian music and entertainment news. The remix features a Punjabi breakdown with South Asian sounding vocals and includes some added Desi flavors courtesy of dholki, dhol and tumbi beats, which are common instruments in South Asian music. Baba Kahn of the production team Culture Shock stated, "Our goal was to take Britney's smash hit single and give fans a total Desi adrenaline rush. The result is a Culture Shock musical Desi roller coaster that hopefully everyone around the world will want to join." Mark Flaherty, senior vice president of Jive Label Group, said about the remix:

"We wanted to build an even greater connection between the world's biggest pop star and one of the world's largest audiences. Britney has been engaged with South Asian culture for many years. From the groundbreaking Bollywood-inspired remix of 'Me Against the Music' to her recent collaboration with Indian fashion designers Falguni and Shane Peacock on the 'Hold It Against Me' video, she has embraced the incredible sights and sounds of this vibrant community throughout her career."

Michigan band Salem released a slowed-down version of the song, and made a music video featuring seemingly underage strippers and military footage. A remix featuring R. Kelly was leaked online on July 4, 2011. It features him singing the second verse, "Slide up in this club / This beat's got me in love / Till I just don't care / It's like I'm walking on air / It's a party right here", and a new hook, where he repeats the line "Party till the world ends". His vocals join those of Spears during the breakdown, and the song ends with Kelly doing runs over the chorus. A reporter from Idolator said, "We'd much rather listen to Britney's original than this uninspired remix when doomsday comes."

== Commercial performance ==
"Till the World Ends" sold 117,000 copies after its first three days of sales in the United States, debuting at number twenty on the Billboard Hot 100 on the week of March 19, 2011. It became the fifth highest debut of her twenty-five entries on the chart. It also debuted at number ten on the Hot Digital Songs chart, and at number sixty-eight on the Radio Songs chart; on the latter chart, the song debuted at number sixty-eight with 16.8 million impressions on 145 stations. On the issue dated March 17, 2011, "Till the World Ends" sold 158,000 downloads (up 36%), peaking at number five on the Hot Digital Songs chart. On the Hot 100, it climbed to number nine, becoming her tenth top ten hit. The song also jumped to number forty-seven on the Radio Songs chart with 26 million impressions (up 56%), and debuted at number twenty-six on the Pop Songs chart. It later peaked at number four. The following week, "Till the World Ends" dropped out of the top ten of the Hot 100; it returned three weeks later at number eight, on April 13, 2011. Following the release of the remix featuring Nicki Minaj and Kesha, the song peaked at number three on the Hot Digital Songs chart, with combined sales of 246,000 downloads (up 102%). The remix accounted for 167,000 copies (68%) of the total sales. "Till the World Ends" also peaked at number three on the Hot 100, becoming Spears's eleventh top-ten hit and her third of 2011 after "Hold It Against Me" and the "S&M" remix with Rihanna. In May 2011, the song peaked at number 4 on the airplay chart, her highest-charting song on the radio in her entire career. "Till the World Ends" became Spears' seventh number-one dance song when it topped the chart in May 2011. On the week of July 10, 2011, the song surpassed two million downloads in the United States. As of March 2015, "Till the World Ends" has sold over three million copies in the United States.

The single debuted at number sixteen on the Canadian Hot 100, and climbed to number seven the next week. Following the release of the remix, "Till the World Ends" peaked at number four. On March 14, 2011, the song debuted at number nineteen on the ARIA Charts of Australia. It climbed to number eight on the week of April 25, 2011, where it stayed for two consecutive weeks. "Till the World Ends" stayed for sixteen weeks on the chart. It has since been certified 2× Platinum by the Australian Recording Industry Association (ARIA) for sales of 140,000 units. In New Zealand, the song debuted at number ten on March 14, 2011. It stayed for seventeen weeks on the chart. On March 10, 2011, "Till the World Ends" debuted at number seven on the Irish Singles Chart. In the United Kingdom, "Till the World Ends" debuted at number fifty-five on March 7, 2011, and moved to number twenty-one the following week. It became her second lowest peaking single behind "Radar" (2009) and her lowest peaking second single from a studio release. Across Europe, the song has peaked at number two in Norway; number four in Sweden; number six in Belgium (Wallonia) and Finland; number seven in Denmark and Switzerland; number eight in France and Slovakia; and the top twenty in Brazil, Belgium (Flanders), Czech Republic, Greece and Spain.

== Music video ==
=== Development ===
The music video for "Till the World Ends" was directed by Ray Kay and filmed inside a basement in Los Angeles, California. On March 17, 2011, Spears posted on her Twitter account, "Day 1 of the #TTWE Videoshoot. Just wrapped my first big dance number. Taking a well deserved break people!" She also tweeted a picture of her on set, wearing ripped tights, a Burberry Prorsum studded leather jacket and matching fingerless leather gloves. The making-of was chronicled on the special Britney Spears: I Am the Femme Fatale, which aired on MTV on April 3, 2011, at 21:00 EST (02:00 UTC). In the special, Spears is seen watching the playback, as she later explained, "[It is] just to make sure it's right and that the costume looks right and the dancers are together and we all look in unison. It's an energy and it looks fresh. It has a certain vibe with it and it makes sense." She also went on to describe the set as "grimy and gross [...] It was sweat and it was disgusting sometimes". At a point in the shoot, Spears changed her heels to Ugg boots during the shots that did not show her feet, stating that "[Dancing in heels] hurts ... but it looks good. It wasn't a full-length shot, so a girl's about comfort when it's not showing." Spears said that she did not feel the need to top herself, saying that "I've made so many videos that I'm at the point that I genuinely want to enjoy myself, and I have such a good team of people with me. [...] I had never worked with Ray Kay before. I was really happy with the work we did." The video was choreographed by Brian Friedman. On April 4, 2011, it was announced that two different versions of the music video would be released, a director's cut and a choreography cut. The same day, Spears tweeted a 30-second preview of the video, announcing, "#TillTheWorldEnds video premieres THIS Wednesday on VEVO. Cant wait to share it with you guys!"

=== Synopsis ===
Spears in a scene reminiscent of the music video for "I'm a Slave 4 U" (2001)

The video begins with the words "December 21st, 2012" flashing on screen, the day that refers to the fulfillment of the Great Cycle, Baktun in the Mayan calendar. Spears appears strutting in an underground party wearing a studded leather jacket and stockings. Several people are seen running to a manhole and enter the sewer system to arrive to the party. This is followed by a dance routine in which Spears is wearing a sequined bodysuit and a small jacket with shoulder pads accompanied by female dancers. During the video, there are scenes of buildings burning and debris falling, as well as intercut scenes of Spears in front of an illuminated background. As the second verse begins, she dances provocatively with her male dancers. In the last chorus, the sun rises while water is sprayed through the dance floor and the earthquake and meteor shower subside. The video ends with Spears coming out of a manhole wearing the red bodysuit and smiling.

The director's cut premiered on April 6, 2011, at 03:00 EST (08:00 UTC). Kevin O'Donnell of Spin compared the "Till the World Ends" video to "I'm a Slave 4 U" and added that it takes elements of classic Spears videos, such as "scantily-clad dancers, tightly executed choreography, ridonkulously sequined outfits, and pouty, overly sincere close-ups of Spears" and "places them in an apocalyptic, end-of-days scenario." Jocelyn Vena of MTV also highlighted the comparisons to "I'm a Slave 4 U", explaining that "the director's cut of the video is a sexy mash-up of Spears doing what she does best: groping half-naked guys, giving the camera bedroom eyes and being sassy in a number of leather jackets and skintight bodysuits." Chris Gayomali of Time stated that the video "[i]s sweaty, at times blinding, yet undeniably enjoyable, adopting many of its key elements from Britney's coming-of-age 'I'm a Slave 4 U.'" Matthew Perpetua of Rolling Stone called it "a good, memorable video." Tanner Stransky of Entertainment Weekly said it "is exactly what you’d expect for this song, and from Britney at this point in her career", and also complimented Spears for getting rid of the product placement in the "Hold It Against Me" video.

Wesley Case of The Baltimore Sun stated that video "is typical 2011 party-starter — sweaty bodies, futuristic DJ-gear, well-timed faulty sprinkler system — but it captures the track's raging mood perfectly." Gina Serpe of E! Online also compared the video to "I'm a Slave 4 U", saying, "[There's] nothing wrong with a little nod to vintage Britney. Plus, sweaty dancers in tunnels pulsing and writhing in sync to the music? Seems like as good a way as any to survive the apocalypse." Willa Paskin of New York commented that Spears "tries hard not to make the same mistakes as the inadvertently depressing 'Hold It Against Me'. There's more dancing — though it's still largely arm-related — and much, much more smiling." The music video was nominated at the 2011 MuchMusic Video Awards in the category of International Video of the Year — Artist, but lost to Lady Gaga's "Judas". It also received two nominations at the 2011 MTV Video Music Awards in the categories of Best Pop Video and Best Choreography. Spears told MTV News she was "completely flattered" by the nominations. She lost Best Choreography to Beyoncé's "Run the World (Girls)", but won Best Pop Video.

=== Choreography cut ===
The video is similar to the director's cut, but has a few differences. The choreography cut offers lengthier shots of Spears and her dancers, and much of the apocalypse storyline is edited out. The clip's ending is also different from the original: instead of emerging from the manhole Spears just looks into the camera, apparently still hiding in the underground party and hinting at a darker ending in which the world does end. On April 9, 2011, Spears tweeted that she had seen the final cut of the dance version, and was not sure which one she liked best. Ray Kay tweeted on April 14, 2011, that the original version of the video was better, "but it's fun to watch the choreography too." The video, titled "DANCE Till the World Ends" premiered on April 15, 2011. Leah Collins of Dose commented, "sorry, Team Britney, but if any of you were hoping to pass off Spears’ anemic performance in the original as the result of unfortunate editing, this clip isn't exactly going to bring anyone back on side."

=== Twister remix ===
An accompanying music video for the Twister Remix of "Till the World Ends" was also directed by Ray Kay, and released on September 8, 2012. For the music video, Spears sported a $20,000 sports bra and black leggins from Body Rock. It begins with four girls talking and resting in a dance studio. Once Spears enters the room and starts playing Twister with the girls, the scenario changes to a stage with a colorful background, and they all start performing a dance routine to a remix of the song. After the song stops and the four girls are seen laying down tired, Spears turns around to them and say, "Way to rock the spots, ladies."

== Live performances and cover versions ==
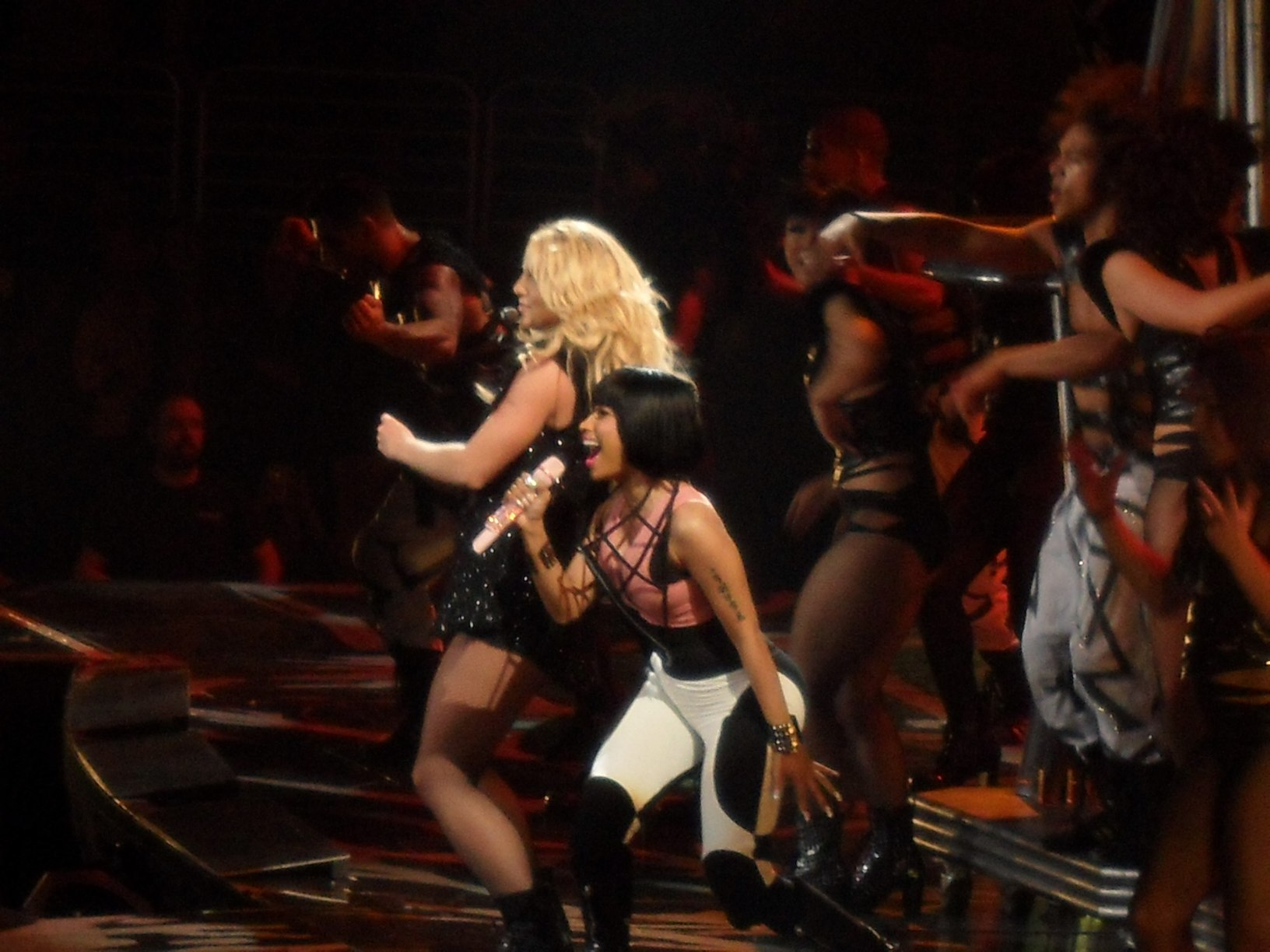
Spears and Minaj performing The Femme Fatale Remix of "Till the World Ends" at the Femme Fatale Tour

Spears first performed "Till the World Ends" at Rain Nightclub in the Palms Casino Resort on March 25, 2011. After performances of "Hold It Against Me" and "Big Fat Bass", Spears appeared wearing a black latex bodysuit covered in red lights and surrounded by her dancers, while the stage was filled with ladders and LED lighting. At the end, she ascended the ladders and ended up on a platform, gyrating from above the room. As fireworks lit the stage, Spears danced and tossed her hair as the song closed. She also taped performances of "Hold It Against Me", "Big Fat Bass" and "Till the World Ends" at the Bill Graham Civic Auditorium on March 27, 2011, that aired on Good Morning America on March 29, 2011. The same day, Spears performed the set on Jimmy Kimmel Live!. On May 22, 2011, she briefly performed the song at the Billboard Music Awards in the MGM Grand Garden Arena. After Minaj performed "Super Bass", she started to sing the rap verse of the Femme Fatale Remix. Spears emerged onstage for the chorus and performed alongside Minaj and her back up dancers while walking to a minor stage.

Spears also performed "Till the World Ends" at the Femme Fatale Tour (2011). At the end of "Toxic", she goes below the stage and returns wearing a black sparkly bodysuit for "Till the World Ends". Halfway through the performance, Minaj appears on the backdrops rapping her verse of the Femme Fatale Remix of the song. She also joined Spears to perform the verse in select cities. After the song changes back to the original version, Spears starts flying in a platform with giant angel wings. The show ends with Spears and her dancers thanking the audience, as confetti falls and the "Femme Fatale" sign is lowered onstage. Jason L. Nelson of The Beaver County Times said that "encore hits 'Toxic' and 'Till the World Ends' kept the crowd beaming." Spears also performed the song as part of the encore section from her Las Vegas residency Britney: Piece of Me. At the end of the performance, Spears ascended into the back of the stage in a globe-cage. Mirroring the setlist of her Las Vegas residency, "Till the World Ends" is also the encore of Britney: Live in Concert, with Spears leaving the stage after performing "(You Drive Me) Crazy" for a few minutes, and then returning to perform the song as the encore.

During the Pink Friday Tour, Nicki Minaj included "Till the World Ends" as an interlude.

Kesha performed the song on select dates as part of her setlist on the Kesha and the Creepies: Fuck the World Tour in 2016, as well as the Only Love Tour in 2023.

Electronicore band I See Stars covered the song as a track for the Punk Goes Pop Volume 4 compilation.

== Track listings ==
- French CD single
1. "Till the World Ends" (Album Version) – 3:57
2. "Till the World Ends" (The Femme Fatale Remix featuring Nicki Minaj and Kesha) – 4:44
- German CD single
1. "Till the World Ends" (Album Version) – 3:57
2. "Till the World Ends" (Instrumental Version) – 3:57
- Digital download
1. "Till the World Ends" – 3:58
- Digital download (The Femme Fatale Remix)
1. "Till the World Ends" (The Femme Fatale Remix featuring Nicki Minaj and Kesha) – 4:44
- Digital download (Culture Shock Remix)
1. "Till the World Ends" (Culture Shock Remix) – 4:02
- Digital download (Twister Remix)
1. "Till the World Ends" (Twister Remix) – 4:19
- Digital download (EP)
1. "Till the World Ends" (Album Version) – 3:58
2. "Till the World Ends" (Instrumental Version) – 3:58
3. "Till the World Ends" (Billionaire Extended Remix) – 5:20
4. "Till the World Ends" (Video) – 3:55
- Digital download (The Femme Fatale Four Pack)
1. "Till the World Ends" (The Femme Fatale Remix featuring Nicki Minaj and Kesha) – 4:44
2. "Till the World Ends" (Culture Shock Remix) – 4:02
3. "Dance Till the World Ends" (Video) – 3:52
4. "Till the World Ends" (Culture Shock Remix Video) – 3:59
- Digital download (The Remixes)
1. "Till the World Ends" – 3:58
2. "Till the World Ends" (Bloody Beetroots Extended Remix) – 4:06
3. "Till the World Ends" (White Sea Extended Club Remix) – 4:50
4. "Till the World Ends" (Kik Klap Radio Remix) – 3:41
5. "Till the World Ends" (Alex Suarez Radio Remix) – 3:56
6. "Till the World Ends" (Friscia and Lamboy Club Remix) – 9:57
7. "Till the World Ends" (Varsity Team Radio Remix) – 4:15
8. "Till the World Ends" (Karmatronic Extended Club Remix) – 6:47
- Digital download (The UK Remixes)
1. "Till the World Ends" – 3:58
2. "Till the World Ends" (Gareth Wyn Remix) – 6:25
3. "Till the World Ends" (Olli Collins + Fred Portelli Remix) – 6:01
4. "Till the World Ends" (Billionaire Extended Remix) – 5:20
5. "Till the World Ends" (Billionaire Radio Remix) – 2:58

== Credits and personnel ==
- Britney Spears – lead vocals
- Dr. Luke – songwriter, producer, instruments, programming and background vocals
- Alexander Kronlund – songwriter, instruments and programming
- Max Martin – songwriter, producer, instruments, programming and background vocals
- Kesha Sebert – songwriter/background vocals and guest vocals
- Billboard – producer, instruments and programming
- Serban Ghenea – audio mixing
- Emily Wright – engineering and vocal production
- Sam Holland – engineering and background vocals
- Nicki Minaj – songwriter, background vocals and guest vocals
- Aniela Gottwald – assistant engineer
- John Hanes – mix engineer
- Tim Roberts – assistant mix engineer
- Stacey Barnett – background vocals
- Bonnie McKee – background vocals and guest vocals
- Patrizia Rogosch – background vocals
- Tom Coyne – mastering

Credits adapted from Till the World Ends liner notes.

== Charts ==
=== Weekly charts ===
Chart (2011)	Peak position
Australia (ARIA)	8
Austria (Ö3 Austria Top 40)	23
Belgium (Ultratop 50 Flanders)	12
Belgium (Ultratop 50 Wallonia)	6
Brazil (Brasil Hot 100 Airplay)	19
Brazil (Brasil Hot Pop Songs)	3
Canada Hot 100 (Billboard)	4
Canada CHR/Top 40 (Billboard)	3
Canada Hot AC (Billboard)	3
CIS Airplay (TopHit)	1
Croatia (HRT)	2
Czech Republic Airplay (ČNS IFPI)	10
Denmark (Tracklisten)	7
Euro Digital Song Sales (Billboard)	12
Finland (Suomen virallinen lista)	6
France (SNEP)	8
Germany (GfK)	27
Global Dance Tracks (Billboard)	7
Greece (Greek Airplay)	18
Hungary (Editors' Choice Top 40)	27
Ireland (IRMA)	7
Israel International Airplay (Media Forest)	2
Italy (FIMI)	30
Japan Hot 100 (Billboard)	52
Lebanon (The Official Lebanese Top 20)	14
Mexico Airplay (Billboard)	1
Netherlands (Dutch Top 40 Tipparade)	2
Netherlands (Single Top 100)	29
New Zealand (Recorded Music NZ)	10
Norway (VG-lista)	2
Poland (Polish Airplay TV)	1
Portugal Digital Songs (Billboard)	9
Romania (Romanian Top 100)	37
Russia Airplay (TopHit)	1
Scottish Singles Sales (Official Charts)	10
Slovakia (Rádio Top 100)	8
South Korea (Circle)	85
South Korea Foreign (Circle)	4
Spain (Promusicae)	11
Spain Airplay (PROMUSICAE)	1
Sweden (Sverigetopplistan)	4
Switzerland (Schweizer Hitparade)	7
Ukraine Airplay (TopHit)	16
UK Singles (Official Charts)	21
US Billboard Hot 100	3
US Adult Pop Airplay (Billboard)	19
US Dance Club Songs (Billboard)	1
US Dance Airplay (Billboard)	3
US Pop Airplay (Billboard)	4
US Rhythmic Airplay (Billboard)	9

=== Monthly charts ===
Chart (2011)	Peak position
CIS (TopHit)	2
Russia Airplay (TopHit)	3
Ukraine Airplay (TopHit)	22

=== Year-end charts ===
Chart (2011)	Position
Australia (ARIA)	71
Australia (ARIA Dance)	19
Belgium (Ultratop 50 Flanders)	45
Belgium (Ultratop 50 Wallonia)	21
Brazil (Crowley Broadcast Analysis)	50
Canada (Canadian Hot 100)	26
CIS (TopHit)	17
Croatia (HRT)	29
Denmark (Tracklisten)	50
France (SNEP)	27
France Airplay (SNEP)	33
Israel (Media Forest)	41
Lebanon (Lebanese Top 20)	13
Russia Airplay (TopHit)	28
Spain (PROMUSICAE)	37
Spain Airplay (PROMUSICAE)	20
Sweden (Digilistan)	39
Sweden (Sverigetopplistan)	51
Switzerland (Schweizer Hitparade)	49
South Korea Foreign (Circle)	53
Ukraine Airplay (TopHit)	39
UK Singles (OCC)	143
US Billboard Hot 100	27
US Dance Club Songs (Billboard)	17
US Dance/Mix Show Airplay (Billboard)	26
US Pop Airplay (Billboard)	16
US Radio Songs (Billboard)	25
US Rhythmic (Billboard)	50

== Certifications and sales ==
Region	Certification	Certified units/sales
Australia (ARIA)	2× Platinum	140,000^{^}
Belgium (BRMA)	Gold	15,000^{*}
Denmark (IFPI Danmark)	Gold	15,000^{^}
France	—	104,800
Italy (FIMI)	Gold	15,000^{*}
Mexico (AMPROFON)	Gold	30,000^{*}
New Zealand (RMNZ)	Gold	7,500^{*}
South Korea	—	288,307
Sweden (GLF)	3× Platinum	120,000^{‡}
Switzerland (IFPI Switzerland)	Gold	15,000^{^}
United Kingdom (BPI)	Silver	200,000^{‡}
United States (RIAA)	4× Platinum	4,000,000^{‡}
Streaming
Denmark (IFPI Danmark)	Gold	50,000^{†}
^{*} Sales figures based on certification alone.^{^} Shipments figures based on certification alone.^{‡} Sales+streaming figures based on certification alone.^{†} Streaming-only figures based on certification alone.

== Release history ==
Release dates and formats for "Till the World Ends"
Region	Date	Version(s)	Format(s)	Label(s)	Ref.
Germany	March 4, 2011	Original	Digital download	Sony Music	
United Kingdom	March 4, 2011	Original	Digital download	RCA	
United States	March 4, 2011	Original	Digital download	Jive	
United States	March 7, 2011	Original	Contemporary hit radio	Jive	
Germany	April 15, 2011	Original	CD	Sony Music	
United Kingdom	April 25, 2011	The Femme Fatale remix	Digital download	RCA	
United States	April 25, 2011	The Femme Fatale remix	Digital download	Jive	

== See also ==
- List of number-one dance singles of 2011 (U.S.)
