= Jake Wesley Rogers =

American singer-songwriter (born 1996)

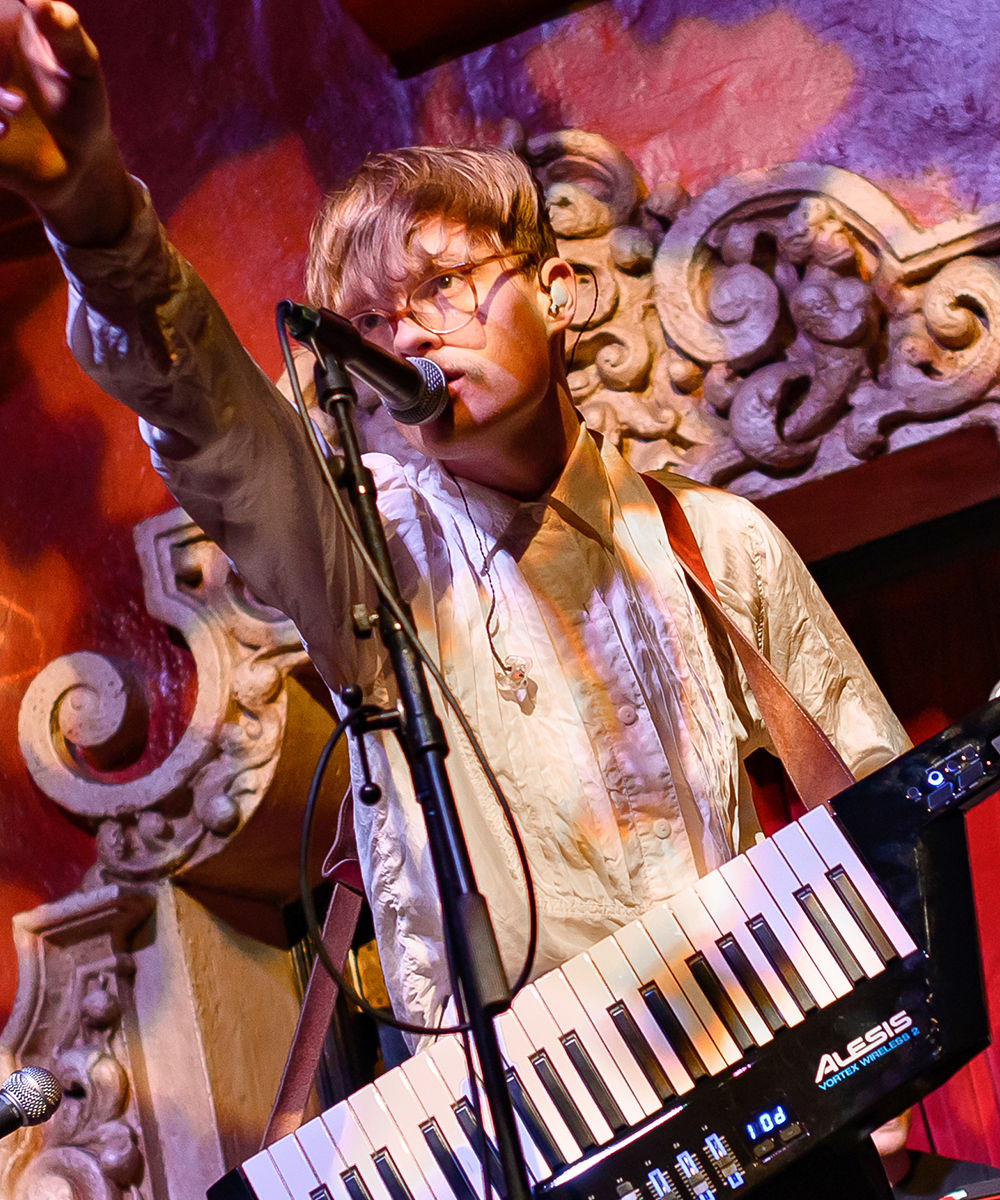
- Jake Wesley Rogers

Background information
- Born: December 19, 1996 (age 29); Springfield, Missouri, U.S.
- Genres: Pop, singer-songwriter
- Occupations: Musician, singer, songwriter
- Years active: 2012–present
- Labels: Warner, Facet
- Website: www.jakewesleyrogers.com

Jake Wesley Rogers (born December 19, 1996) is an American pop musician and songwriter.

== Early life ==
Rogers grew up in Ozark, Missouri, where he learned to play the guitar at the age of six and began playing piano and voice training at age 12. Rogers began performing in theater productions in 5th grade and writing songs soon thereafter. At a young age he attended formative concerts for artists like Lady Gaga and Nelly Furtado. Rogers came out as gay in 6th grade, and though his family was supportive he felt he had to hide his orientation due to the cultural climate in his hometown.

At age 15, Rogers appeared as a contestant on the seventh season of America's Got Talent. He advanced to the top 48 and was eliminated in the quarterfinal round before being brought back into the competition by judge Sharon Osbourne, only to be eliminated again in the Wild Card round.

Rogers moved to Nashville at age 18 to study songwriting at Belmont University. In his first year Rogers' live performance attracted the interest of Sony/ATV, resulting in a publishing deal. Rogers graduated in 2018.

== Career ==
=== 2016–2020: Early career ===
Rogers began releasing music independently in 2016, leading to his debut EP Evergreen in June 2017. After releasing his next two singles "Jacob from the Bible" and "Little Queen" in February and March 2019 respectively, Rogers released his sophomore EP Spiritual in April 2019, followed by a European tour and a performance on BBC Radio 4 that fall.

In November 2020, Rogers was featured on the Happiest Season soundtrack executive produced by Justin Tranter, alongside a slate of other LGBTQ songwriters and artists.

=== 2021–present: Warner Records signing ===
In May 2021, it was revealed that Rogers had signed to Warner Records via Tranter's imprint Facet Records. Rogers' manager Lucas Canzona got Tranter's attention in 2019 with an email highlighting a live performance of Rogers' single "Jacob from the Bible". Tranter brought Rogers to the attention of Warner Records CEO and co-chairman Aaron Bay-Schuck, who was "captivated" by Rogers' live performance, and the two signed Rogers in late 2020. Rogers released his debut major label single "Middle of Love" alongside the announcement. The single, which was co-written with Tranter and Eren Cannata, is the first offering from Rogers' forthcoming 2021 EP. Rogers released his next single "Momentary" in June 2020. Rogers made his TV debut on October 5, 2021, on The Late Late Show with James Corden (Season 7, Episode 17), performing the song "Middle of Love". Rogers appeared as an opening act on Ben Platt's Reverie Tour in September and October 2022. Rogers also appeared as an opening act on Panic! At the Disco's Viva Las Vengeance Tour in September and October 2022. Rogers also appeared as the opening act on Kesha's Only Love tour in 2023.

== Discography ==
=== Albums ===
Title	Album details
In The Key of Love	Released: May 9, 2025; Formats: digital download, streaming, vinyl; Label: Facet Records/Warner Records

=== EPs ===
Title	Album details
Evergreen	Released: June 16, 2017; Formats: digital download, streaming; Label: Self released
Spiritual	Released: April 5, 2019; Formats: digital download, streaming; Label: Self released
Pluto	Released: October 1, 2021; Formats: digital download, streaming, vinyl; Label: Facet Records/Warner Records
LOVE	Released: October 21, 2022; Formats: digital download, streaming; Label: Facet Records/Warner Records

=== Singles ===
Title	Year	Album
"You Should Know"	2017	Evergreen
"Jacob From the Bible"	2019	Spiritual
"Little Queen"	2019	Spiritual
"Middle of Love"	2021	Pluto
"Momentary"	2021	Pluto
"Weddings and Funerals"	2021	Pluto
"Dark Bird"	2022	LOVE
"Lavender Forever"	2022	LOVE
"Modern Love"	2022	LOVE
"Hindsight"	2022	LOVE
"Window"	2023	Window
"Loser"	2024	In the Key of Love
"God Bless"	2025	In the Key of Love
"Hot Gospel"	2025	In the Key of Love
"My Misery"	2025	In the Key of Love
