= Only Love Can Save Us Now =

Single by Kesha

from the album Gag Order
- Released: May 17, 2023
- Studio: Shangri-La
- Genre: Electronic; gospel; country; soul
- Length: 2:34
- Label: RCA; Kemosabe
- Songwriters: Kesha Sebert; Jussi Karvinen; Ajay Bhattacharya
- Producers: Kesha; Rick Rubin; Stint; Jussifer

Kesha singles chronology
"Fine Line" / "Eat the Acid" (2023)	"Only Love Can Save Us Now" (2023)	"Joyride" (2024)

Music video
- "Only Love Can Save Us Now" on YouTube

"Only Love Can Save Us Now" is a song by American singer-songwriter Kesha from her fifth studio album, Gag Order (2023). Ahead of the album's release, the song was issued as its third single on May 17, 2023, alongside a lyric video. The track was written and produced by Kesha, Stint, and Jussifer, with additional production by Rick Rubin.

== Background ==
Kesha appeared on an episode of CBS' 60 Minutes, that featured her recording vocal takes at Shangri-La with a gospel choir and Rick Rubin. Three days after the premiere, the singer went on Instagram Live to preview the song. She announced the single's release on May 15, 2023.

The track was partially written as a LGBTQ anthem as Kesha observed injustices that the community faces in the US. "Saying it's heartbreaking is not enough," the singer said in her 2023 Self cover story, "I don't have the answer, and I'm not a politician, but that's the energy. It gets really exhausting seeing attack after attack after attack on the queer community."

== Composition and lyrics ==
The song lasts 2 minutes and 34 seconds and features the singer rapping about the problems she faces daily. Lyrically, the song features Kesha looking to a higher power in difficult times and contains many religious references. She described it as a "push and pull" of "control and struggle". The track mixes contrasting genres and opens with an electronic production before transitioning to acoustic guitar on the chorus as Kesha praises the power of love while backed by a gospel choir. The song also contains elements of country, gospel, and soul. Her idea for the single was to sonically blend "aggressive expression" and "euphoria". The singer also alludes to her legal issues with producer Dr. Luke, whom she sued for alleged sexual assault and battery, with lyrics: "I'm getting sued because my mom has been tweeting/ Don't fucking tell me that I'm dealing with reason." According to Kesha on her social medias, the song is a "desperate and angry prayer" and reflects on her "mental pendulum swings".

== Critical reception ==
Alex Rigotti of Clash named "Only Love Can Save Us Now" the highlight of the album and a "beautifully euphoric anthem", praising Kesha's rap flow. Gay Times' Conor Clark called the song an "epic club banger".

== Music video ==
The official music video was announced on June 14, 2023 with a teaser video for "Only Love Reprise". The video was released the following day and was directed by Vincent Haycock, who was the creative director for Kesha's album. It is the only single off the album to receive a proper music video, rather than a visualizer. The video starts off with a man wearing a skin-tight body suit with Kesha's face on it running in traffic and pouting on a sidewalk. The video is intercut with shots of a person mummified in red cellophane sitting in a folding chair, fuzzy ottoman in a red room wearing a mask, and Kesha in an art gallery filled with bemused patrons who look at her in disdain at as she convulses on the floor and raises her hands to the heavens.

== Live performances ==
Kesha performed the song on Vevo live for the first time on May 24, 2023. On June 15, 2023, she performed "Only Love Can Save Us Now" at iHeartRadio's "Can't Cancel Pride" event. An acoustic performance was included on Kesha's third extended play, Gag Order (Live Acoustic EP from Space). The song was included in the setlist for the Only Love Tour as the opening number. The song was also included in the setlist of her two subsequent tours The Tits Out Tour and The Freedom Tour (Kesha).

== Track listing ==
Digital download and streaming

1. "Only Love Can Save Us Now" – 2:34

Digital download and streaming (remixes)

1. "Only Love Can Save Us Now" (KC Lights remix) – 3:33
2. "Only Love Can Save Us Now" (Milkblood remix) – 3:31
3. "Only Love Can Save Us Now" (Moti remix) – 4:09
4. "Only Love Can Save Us Now" (Oddprophet remix) – 3:04
5. "Only Love Can Save Us Now" – 2:34

== Release history ==
Release dates and formats for "Only Love Can Save Us Now"
Region	Date	Formats	Version	Labels	Ref.
Various	May 17, 2023	Digital download; streaming	Original	Kemosabe; RCA	
Various	June 23, 2023	Digital download; streaming	Remixes	Kemosabe; RCA	

== Charts ==
=== Weekly charts ===
Weekly chart performance for "Only Love Can Save Us Now"
Chart (2023)	Peak position
Latvia Airplay (TopHit)	32

=== Monthly charts ===
Monthly chart performance for "Only Love Can Save Us Now"
Chart (2023)	Peak position
Latvia Airplay (TopHit)	45
