= Gag Order (album) =

2023 studio album by Kesha

- Standard cover (Note: As of May 16, 2025, the cover has been altered on digital and streaming platforms to feature a purple and pink filter.)

Studio album by Kesha
- Released: May 19, 2023
- Recorded: 2020–2022
- Studio: Shangri-La (Malibu)
- Genres: Art pop; experimental; electronic; psychedelic
- Length: 38:53
- Labels: Kemosabe; RCA
- Producers: Kesha; Rick Rubin; Stuart Crichton; Jason Lader; Hudson Mohawke; Jussifer; Drew Pearson; Stint

Kesha chronology
High Road (2020)	Gag Order (2023)	Gag Order (Live Acoustic EP from Space) (2023)

Singles from Gag Order
- 1. "Fine Line" / "Eat the Acid" Released: April 28, 2023; 2. "Only Love Can Save Us Now" Released: May 17, 2023

Gag Order (also referred to as Eat the Acid on streaming services) is the fifth studio album by American singer-songwriter Kesha. It was released on May 19, 2023, by Kemosabe Records and RCA Records. This album marks her final release under her contract with both labels, which she signed when she was 18 years old. The announcement of the album came in late April 2023, with Kesha serving as the executive producer, a role she took on for her previous two albums. She primarily worked with producer Rick Rubin, who helped her dive deep into her more vulnerable side to create the project. Other producers on the album include familiar collaborators such as Stuart Crichton, Stint and Drew Pearson, as well as new collaborators like Jussifer, Hudson Mohawke, Kennedi, and Jason Lader.

Musically, Gag Order diverges from the electro-pop sound of Kesha's previous album, High Road, and explores a range of genres, including art pop, experimental, electronic, and psychedelic elements. Additionally, the album incorporates influences from minimalism, hyperpop, soul, lo-fi, dark wave, country, and gospel genres. Kesha describes the album as a culmination of all the genres of music she enjoys.

Lyrically, the album delves into darker themes such as death, depression, emotional exploitation, control, hope, and a quest for truth. In contrast to High Road, which aimed to recapture her party pop sound, Gag Order finds Kesha focusing on overcoming trauma and depression resulting from her legal battle with her former producer, Dr. Luke.

Critically, the album received positive reviews from music critics, who particularly praised Kesha's vocals and songwriting, although opinions on the production were more varied. In anticipation of the album's release, three singles were unveiled: "Eat the Acid" and "Fine Line", (released as a dual single), and "Only Love Can Save Us Now". A live acoustic extended play titled Gag Order (Live Acoustic EP from Space) was released on June 30, 2023. It includes four live acoustic performances of songs from the album. To promote the album, Kesha embarked on the Only Love Tour, which ran from October 15 to November 26, 2023.

== Background ==
Before the release of her fourth album, High Road, Billboard published a cover story about the singer stating that she already had a "gorgeous folk album that is just waiting for its moment to shine," but the release would depend on her legal battle. Kesha announced the album on April 25, 2023. It was entirely co-produced by Rick Rubin. After falling out of her craft, Rubin helped Kesha fall in love with music again and focused on making good music, rather than trying to make what would do well on the charts. "The whole process with Rick that blew my mind was being present in how I feel and making it come out into the song in a way that felt like it's reflective of the feeling, a sound that reflects a feeling," she recounted working with the producer while being interviewed by Apple Music 1's Zane Lowe. She went on to say she has never made an album simply for the art and the two never once mentioned things like singles or radio play.

The album title is supposed to reflect the situation she has been under due to the legal case against producer Dr. Luke, leaving her unable to speak or comment on it. The legal battle was initiated by Kesha who sued the producer for sexual assault and battery in 2014. In response, Dr. Luke countersued her for defamation and the case was set for trial in July 2023. However, Kesha and Dr. Luke released a joint statement stating the case reached a settlement a month before the trial. Labeled "post-pop" and "emotional exorcism", the project finds Kesha at her most vulnerable. In a Rolling Stone interview, she revealed that releasing the album feels like "giving birth to the most intimate thing" she has ever created, citing anxiety during the COVID-19 pandemic and spiritual experiences of the previous three years as main influences. According to her, the record bundles up emotions "of anger, of insecurity, of anxiety, of grief, of pain, of regret". The pandemic made the singer face these emotions she had avoided dealing with, particularly around her image after years of judgment from the public. Guest appearances include her mother Pebe Sebert, her eight-year-old niece Luna on "Only Love Reprise", Neopagan leader, Oberon Zell, and Ram Dass in archival audio.

A couple days before the album's second anniversary, the artwork was changed to have a pink and purple filter, as well as the album's title being updated to Eat the Acid on streaming platforms. In a statement on Kesha's social media, she mentions how Rick Rubin let her be vulnerable and created a safe space for her during a hard time for her. She states the album's title was originally Eat the Acid, but at the time she did not "see the light yet". In celebration with the album's anniversary, demo versions of "Fine Line" and "Happy" were released.

== Release and promotion ==
In the months leading up to the album's release, Kesha revealed portions of songs to fans. In early 2023, she live streamed portions of several songs on Instagram, as well as releasing versions of "Eat the Acid" and "Fine Line" onto SoundCloud, before eventually removing them. Kesha got her own hashflags on Twitter by tweeting #Kesha, #GagOrder, or #EatTheAcid. The hashflags consist of the Gag Order logo, the plastic bag from the cover art, and the green chair from one of the promotional images, respectively. Select fans who entered the sweepstakes contest after pre-saving the album were mailed an envelope containing signed posters and lyric cards for the album. A QR code on the poster led to a video message from Kesha. The official track-list was revealed on May 2, 2023; however, Kesha commented on an Instagram post indicating she did not know about the reveal. Three days later, all the lyrics to the entire album were made available for download on her official website. Visualizers for several songs were made and all were directed by Vincent Haycock. Kesha performed "Eat the Acid" and "Only Love Can Save Us Now" for Vevo Live. On June 15, 2023, she performed "Only Love Can Save Us Now" at iHeartRadio's "Can't Cancel Pride" event. To further promote the album, Kesha embarked on her sixth headlining tour, the Only Love Tour on October 15, 2023, which ended on November 26, 2023.

Both "Eat the Acid" and "Fine Line" were released on April 28, 2023, as lead singles for the album. The third single release, "Only Love Can Save Us Now", was released on May 17, 2023.

== Artwork ==
Vincent Haycock photographed the cover artwork for Gag Order, which depicts a portrait of Kesha with a plastic bag over her head. He also directed the visualizers for several songs for the album, as well as the music video for "Only Love Can Save Us Now".

Art director, Brian Roettinger had worked with Kesha on her two previous albums. He stated that the fact the visuals have no nod or callbacks to Kesha's previous work was intentional. "This was a time for shedding ideas from the past that were a bit more maximalist. It's never easy to tell an artist to forget what they are comfortable with. But it's a stage of growth. It was about evolving." The stripped back, single toned and simple typography was to give the album an overall bold and simple aesthetic. The 'E' and 'A' are flipped in Kesha's logo as to make sure the visuals weren't "boring". Roettinger wanted the album's tense art and visuals to elicit an emotional response and to feel discomfort. "A feeling of discomfort. Love it or hate it I wanted people to feel. We are inundated with imagery and music based imagery that it's so easy to quickly glance and move on without feeling anything. I wanted to avoid that."

== Critical reception ==
Professional ratings
Aggregate scores
Source	Rating
AnyDecentMusic?	7.2/10
Metacritic	75/100
Review scores
Source	Rating
AllMusic	3/5 stars
The Arts Desk	4/5 stars
Clash	7/10
The Guardian	4/5 stars
The Independent	5/5 stars
The Line of Best Fit	8/10
MusicOMH	3/5 stars
NME	3/5 stars
Pitchfork	7.1/10
Slant Magazine	3.5/5 stars

Gag Order has received generally positive reviews from music critics. Kesha's vocals and lyrics, and the ability to write about her lawsuit against Dr. Luke without directly referring to it, were met with praise. On the production side, critics felt it was missing something. At Metacritic, which assigns a normalized rating out of 100 to reviews from mainstream critics, the album has an average score of 75 based on 11 reviews. Aggregator AnyDecentMusic? gave it 7.2 out of 10, based on their assessment of the critical consensus. The album was compared to the works of Fiona Apple and Björk.

Paul Attard of Slant Magazine magazine praised Kesha's vocals and the variety of genres, but criticized the back half of the album, saying that the production is "shoddy" and underdeveloped. Helen Brown of The Independent called the album "fascinating" and gave it a perfect score out five stars. She highlighted lead single "Fine Line" and its lyrics, which she considers resonates with all survivors. The Arts Desk's Thomas Green echoed Brown's sentiments of the album being fascinating, and wrote that it's unlike Kesha's other albums. Green stated that the album is "an impressive step forward" for the artist, who "urgently" needed it. Writing for NME, Tom Stitchbury said that the album is an embodiment of someone who found her voice, despite the title.

Alex Rigotti of Clash magazine criticized Rick Rubin's production, saying his minimalist philosophy stifles many of the tracks.

=== Accolades ===
Select rankings for Gag Order on year-end lists
Publication	Accolade	Rank	Ref.
The Arts Desk	Album of the Year 2023	—N/a	
The Independent	The 30 Best Albums of 2023	30	
PopMatters	The 20 Best Pop Albums of 2023	13	
Rolling Stone	The 100 Best Albums of 2023	24	
Slant Magazine	The 50 Best Albums of 2023	16	
The Sunday Times	The 20 Best Albums of 2023	16	

== Commercial performance ==
Gag Order debuted at number 187 on Billboard 200 having sold 8,300 units in the US. It later re-entered at a new peak at number 168.

== Track listing ==
Gag Order track listing
No.	Title	Writer(s)	Producer(s)	Length
1.	"Something to Believe In"	Kesha Sebert; Stuart Crichton; Pebe Sebert	K. Sebert^{[p]}; Crichton; Rick Rubin; Tom Kahre^{[a]}	3:29
2.	"Eat the Acid"	K. Sebert; Crichton; P. Sebert	K. Sebert^{[p]}; Crichton; Rubin; Kahre^{[a]}; Jason Lader^{[m]}	4:03
3.	"Living in My Head"	K. Sebert; Ross Birchard; Gabriella Grombacher; Everett Romano; Rubin	K. Sebert^{[p]}; Hudson Mohawke; Rubin; Kahre^{[a]}	3:06
4.	"Fine Line"	K. Sebert; Ajay Bhattacharyya; P. Sebert	K. Sebert^{[p]}; Crichton; Rubin; Lader; Kahre^{[a]}; Benny Bock^{[m]}; Stint^{[v]}	3:26
5.	"Only Love Can Save Us Now"	K. Sebert; Bhattacharyya; Jussi Karvinen	K. Sebert^{[p]}; Jussifer; Stint; Rubin; Kahre^{[a]}; Jeremy Hatcher^{[a]}; Cory Henry^{[m]}	2:34
6.	"All I Need Is You"	K. Sebert; Bhattacharyya; Karvinen; Rex Kudo; Caroline Pennell; Romano	K. Sebert^{[p]}; Stint; Rubin; Kahre^{[a]}; Bock^{[m]}	3:01
7.	"The Drama"	K. Sebert; Shawn Everett; Drew Pearson; Dee Dee Ramone; Joey Ramone; Johnny Ramone; Kurt Vile	K. Sebert^{[p]}; Lader; Pearson; Rubin; Kahre^{[a]}; Bock^{[m]}	4:23
8.	"Ram Dass Interlude"		Kahre^{[a]}; K. Sebert^{[v]}	1:14
9.	"Too Far Gone"	K. Sebert; Pearson; Skyler Stonestreet	K. Sebert^{[p]}; Pearson; Rubin; Kahre^{[a]}; Lader^{[m]}	2:17
10.	"Peace & Quiet"	K. Sebert; Birchard; Kennedi Lykken; Kathleen	K. Sebert^{[p]}; Hudson Mohawke; Rubin; Kahre^{[a]}	2:57
11.	"Only Love Reprise"	K. Sebert; Bhattacharyya; Karvinen; Rubin; VantaBlaqJungleKat	K. Sebert^{[p]}; Rubin; Lader; Kahre^{[a]}	1:15
12.	"Hate Me Harder"	K. Sebert; Bhattacharyya; Karvinen; Lykken; Pennell; Justin Tranter	K. Sebert^{[p]}; Rubin; Kahre^{[a]}; Luke Reynolds^{[m]}	2:48
13.	"Happy"	K. Sebert; Blake Slatkin; Stonestreet	K. Sebert^{[p]}; Rubin; Kahre^{[a]}; Lader^{[m]}	4:22
Total length:				38:53

Notes

- "The Drama" interpolates Ramones' 1978 single "I Wanna Be Sedated".
- ^{^[p]} signifies a primary and vocal producer.
- ^{^[a]} signifies an additional producer.
- ^{^[m]} signifies a miscellaneous producer.
- ^{^[v]} signifies a vocal producer.

== Personnel ==
Musicians

- Kesha Sebert – vocals
- Luke Reynolds – acoustic guitar, bass guitar (track 1); piano, programming (12)
- CJ Camerieri – French horn, trumpet (1)
- Tom Kahre – drum machine (2, 7, 10), synthesizer (2, 7); bass guitar, keyboards (2); piano (9), guitar (10)
- Heavy Mellow – guitar (3)
- Hudson Mohawke – programming (3, 10)
- Will Graefe – electric guitar (4)
- Jason Lader – acoustic guitar (5), bass guitar (6), keyboards (10); guitar, shaker (13)
- Jeremy Hatcher – acoustic guitar, bass guitar, drum machine, keyboards, programming, synthesizer (5)
- Ashley Williams – background vocals (5, 11)
- Clay Porche – background vocals (5, 11)
- Steve Epting – background vocals (5, 11)
- Jussifer – drum machine (5), guitar (5)
- Stint – drums, guitar, piano, programming (5); keyboards (6)
- Cory Henry – piano (5)
- Richie Kirkpatrick – guitar (7)
- Jon Pfarr – keyboards (7)
- Carl – vocal effects (7)
- Charlie – vocal effects (7)
- Mr. Peeps – vocal effects (7)
- Queso – vocal effects (7)
- Drew Pearson – drums, synthesizer (9)
- VantaBlaqJungleKat – flute (11)
- Luna Rose Sebert Sampayo – vocals (11)
- Mary Lattimore – harp (13)
- Benny Bock – piano (13)
- Rob Moose – viola, violin (13)

Technical

- Stephen Marcussen – mastering
- Jason Lader – mixing, recording
- Dylan Neustadter – engineering
- Jeremy Hatcher – engineering
- Luke Reynolds – engineering
- Tom Kahre – engineering
- Matt Dyson – vocal engineering
- Jon Pfarr – vocal engineering (4), engineering assistance (all tracks)
- Brennan Rubin – production assistance
- Cole Hopcus – production assistance
- David Cesareo – production assistance
- Hollis Howard – production assistance
- Jack Ross – production assistance
- Matt Prater – production assistance
- Ray Braungart – production assistance
- Sofia Staedler – production assistance
- Bobby Mota – engineering assistance
- Colin Willard – engineering assistance
- Gregg White – engineering assistance
- Olivia Painter – engineering assistance

== Charts ==
Chart performance for Gag Order
Chart (2023)	Peak position
Scottish Albums (Official Charts)	80
Spanish Vinyls (Promusicae)	30
UK Albums Sales (Official Charts)	27
US Billboard 200	168
US Top Rock & Alternative Albums (Billboard)	37

== Release history ==
Gag Order release history
Region	Date	Format(s)	Labels	Ref.
Various	May 19, 2023	CD; digital download; streaming	Kemosabe; RCA	
Various	June 30, 2023	Vinyl	Kemosabe; RCA	

== Live Acoustic EP from Space ==
Gag Order (Live Acoustic EP from Space)

EP / live album by Kesha
- Released: June 30, 2023
- Length: 13:16
- Labels: Kemosabe; RCA
- Producers: Nick Annis; Matt Dyson

Kesha chronology
Gag Order (2023)	Gag Order (Live Acoustic EP from Space) (2023)	Period (2025)

Gag Order (Live Acoustic EP from Space) is the live extended play by Kesha. It is the singer's third EP overall and was released on June 30, 2023. The EP contains four live acoustic performances of songs from her album, Gag Order. It is her official last release under Kemosabe Records and RCA Records before her departure from both labels in December 2023.

=== Background ===
Kesha released her fifth studio album, Gag Order in May 2023. The album is the singer's final album that fulfills her contract with Kemosabe Records, which she signed when she was 18. In October 2014, Kesha sued her former producer, Dr. Luke for sexual assault and battery. The producer countersued Kesha for defamation and their trial was set for July 2023. Through a joint statement, Kesha and Dr. Luke announced they have officially reached a settlement, about a month before the trial. In her statement, Kesha stated she does not recall everything that happened the night of the alleged abuse, while Dr. Luke continued to deny he ever raped her. Following the settlement, Kesha went on her social media and expressed her gratitude to her supporters and said she was excited for the "beautiful things to come". The next day, she announced the EP and revealed its cover art. She revealed the four tracks that will appear on the EP: "Only Love Can Save Us Now", "Fine Line", "All I Need Is You", and "Happy".

=== Track listing ===
All tracks are noted as "live acoustic from space", and produced by Nick Annis and Matt Dyson.

Gag Order (Live Acoustic EP from Space) track listing
No.	Title	Writer(s)	Length
1.	"Fine Line"	Kesha Sebert; Ajay Bhattacharyya; Pebe Sebert	3:07
2.	"Only Love Can Save Us Now"	K. Sebert; Bhattacharyya; Jussi Karvinen	2:36
3.	"All I Need Is You"	K. Sebert; Bhattacharyya; Karvinen; Rex Kudo; Caroline Pennell; Everett Romano	2:48
4.	"Happy"	K. Sebert; Blake Slatkin; Skyler Stonestreet	4:45
Total length:			13:16
