= Cannibal (Kesha song) =

Promotional single by Kesha

from the EP Cannibal
- A-side: "Backstabber"
- Released: November 9, 2010
- Recorded: September 2010
- Studio: Conway Recording, Hollywood, California
- Genre: Dance-pop; electropop; electro house; techno
- Length: 3:14
- Label: RCA
- Songwriters: Kesha Sebert; Joshua Coleman; Mathieu Jomphe; Pebe Sebert
- Producers: Ammo; Billboard

Lyric video
- "Cannibal" on YouTube

"Cannibal" is a song by American singer and songwriter Kesha, from her first EP of the same name (2010). The song was written by Kesha alongside Pebe Sebert, Joshua Coleman and Mathieu Jomphe, with production completed by Ammo and Billboard. The song was released as a promotional single as part of the countdown to Kesha's EP Cannibal on November 9, 2010.

== Background and recording ==
The track was written by Kesha Sebert, Joshua Coleman, Mathieu Jomphe and Pebe Sebert, whilst Ammo and Billboard produced the track. The track was recorded in September 2010 at Conway Recording Studios in Hollywood, Los Angeles, California. The song serves as the title track to her first EP, Cannibal and was written, recorded and completed only weeks before the release of the EP.

== Promotion and release ==
Upon its initial release, the song charted on the Canadian Hot 100 and American Billboard Hot 100 charts at numbers 62 and 77, respectively. Kesha performed the song on her tours Get Sleazy Tour (2011) and Kesha and the Creepies: Fuck the World Tour (2016-2017). On October 26, 2026, "Cannibal" was released on a 7-inch vinyl as the B-side to the song, "Backstabber", from Animal.

== Composition ==
Kesha employs a rap-sing style on the track where she raps lyrics like "Whenever you tell me I'm pretty / That's when the hunger really hits me" and "I have a heart I swear I do / Just not baby when it comes to you". "Cannibal", makes use of synth and dance driven backings while Kesha sings about maneater tendencies and makes a reference to notorious serial-killer Jeffrey Dahmer. This song is set in the key of F minor with a tempo of 130 BPM. Her vocal range spans from low note of F4 to high note of F5. Present throughout the song are snippets of Kesha yodeling. The use of Auto Tune and vocoders are prominent throughout the track, also.

== In popular culture ==
In February 2020, the song gained viral status following a dance trend using it on the TikTok app. Following the revival of interest in the song, the song reentered numerous charts, becoming a top 40 single in Canada. In response, Kesha joined the app and released a video of herself performing the viral dance routine alongside Charli D'Amelio and released a lyric video for the song.

== Controversy ==
Following renewed interest in cannibalistic serial killer Dahmer due to the 2022 Netflix series Dahmer – Monster: The Jeffrey Dahmer Story, the song was criticized for a line in which he is referenced. In the second verse, Kesha sings "Be too sweet and you’ll be a goner / Yeah, I’ll pull a Jeffrey Dahmer." Co-writer Pebe Sebert defended Kesha and the song's other writers on TikTok, taking responsibility for writing the lyric and apologizing for offending the families of Dahmer's victims. Very shortly after the release of the Netflix series, Kesha appeared as a musical guest in Hulu's variety special, Huluween Dragstravaganza, where a pre-filmed performance of the song was featured. As a result of the controversy, the lyric was edited and removed.

== Charts ==
Chart (2010)	Peak position
Canada (Canadian Hot 100)	62
US Billboard Hot 100	77
Chart (2020)	Peak position
Argentina Hot 100 (Billboard)	55
Canada Hot 100 (Billboard)	31

== Certifications ==
Region	Certification	Certified units/sales
Australia (ARIA)	Gold	35,000^{‡}
New Zealand (RMNZ)	Gold	15,000^{‡}
United Kingdom (BPI)	Silver	200,000^{‡}
United States (RIAA)	Platinum	1,000,000^{‡}
^{‡} Sales+streaming figures based on certification alone.

== Release history ==
"Cannibal" release history
Region	Date	Formats	Label	Ref.
Various	January 15, 2027	7-inch vinyl	Kesha	
