= Regina Regina (album) =

Studio album by Regina Regina
- Released: January 28, 1997
- Genre: Country
- Label: Giant
- Producer: James Stroud, Wally Wilson

Regina Regina is the only album by the American country music duo Regina Regina. It was released on Giant Records on January 28, 1997. The album includes the single "More Than I Wanted to Know".

== Critical reception ==
Giving it 3 out of 5 stars, Stephen Thomas Erlewine of Allmusic called the album "an appealing set of contemporary country distinguished by Regina Nicks and Regina Leigh's pure, close harmonies, which help give weight even to the mediocre material that clutters the record." He thought that the single "More Than I Wanted to Know" was a "highlight". Dan Kuchar of Country Standard Time gave the album a positive review, saying that it had a "well-defined trademark sound" and was "high-energy country pumped up with heavier than normal drums and guitars". He thought that the album had pop crossover potential. Giving it a "C+", Alanna Nash of Entertainment Weekly thought that the songs were "better-than-average country pop" but that both members of the duo were weak vocalists.

== Track listing ==
1. "More Than I Wanted to Know" (Bob Regan, Michael Noble) — 2:48
2. "The Big Bad Broken Heart" (Mark D. Sanders, Ed Hill) — 3:09
3. "Asking for the Moon" (Chapin Hartford, George Teren) — 3:01
4. "A Far Cry from Him" (Rick Giles, Susan Longacre) — 4:21
5. "Ticket Out of Kansas" (Tia Sillers) — 3:53
6. "Border Town Road" (Wally Wilson, Larry Boone, Paul Nelson) — 3:18
7. "I Should Be Laughing" (Patty Smyth, Glen Burtnik) — 4:07
8. "Right Plan, Wrong Man" (Bill Douglas, Pebe Sebert) — 2:59
9. "Before I Knew About You" (Gary Burr, Tom Shapiro) — 3:16
10. "She'll Let That Telephone Ring" (Tim Mensy, Liz Hengber) — 3:30

== Personnel ==
Compiled from liner notes.

=== Regina Regina ===
- Regina Leigh & Regina Nicks — vocals

=== Musicians ===
- Larry Byrom & Billy Joe Walker, Jr. — acoustic guitar
- Stuart Duncan — fiddle
- Paul Franklin — steel guitar
- Stephen Hill — background vocals
- Dann Huff, Brent Mason, & Brent Rowan — electric guitars
- Tony King — acoustic guitar, background vocals
- Steve Nathan — piano, keyboards
- Michael Rhodes — bass guitar
- James Stroud & Lonnie Wilson — drums

=== Technical ===
- Kevin Beamish — additional recording
- Mark Hagen — assistant
- Julian King — recording
- Chris Lord-Alge — mixing
- Abbe Nameche — production assistant
- Doug Rich — production assistant
- James Stroud — production
- Craig White — assistant
- Wally Wilson — production

=== Singles ===
Year	Single	Peak chart positions	
Year	Single	US Country	CAN Country
1997	"More Than I Wanted to Know"	53	26
1997	"Right Plan, Wrong Man"	—	88
1997	"Asking for the Moon"	—	—
"—" denotes releases that did not chart
