= Backstabber (Kesha song) =

2010 song by Kesha

Promotional single by Kesha

from the album Animal
- B-side: "Cannibal"
- Released: November 6, 2026
- Length: 3:06
- Label: RCA
- Songwriters: Kesha Sebert; David Gamson; Marc Nelkin; Jon Ingoldsby
- Producer: David Gamson

Music video
- "Backstabber" on YouTube

"Backstabber" is a song by American singer-songwriter Kesha from her debut studio album, Animal (2010). The song was originally intended to be released as a single from the album, with a music video being filmed in 2009, but was ultimately shelved. The music video was officially released sixteen years after the song's release on October 25, 2026. It was written by Kesha, David Gamson, who produced the track, Marc Nelkin, and Jon Ingoldsby.

== Background and release ==
Kesha had wanted the song to be released as a single, but the label opted to release "Tik Tok" instead. The song saw a surge in popularity on TikTok, with audience using it as a sound for friendship breakup content. She first teased the release of the music video online, posting about her car being stolen. To commemorate the music video's release, a limited time knife-shaped vinyl will be released, with the 2010 promotional single, "Cannibal" included as the B-side. The version with more explicit lyrics was released on November 6, 2026.

== Composition and lyrics ==
Lyrically, the song was written about a friend who stole Kesha's car. She told Billboard in 2010,

The car is gone, and I was like, ‘What a backstabber!’ And then I found out that she was also talking shit, so I was like, ‘What a shit-talker!’ The next day, I had a writing appointment in Long Beach [Calif.]. I got there and I was like, ‘We should write a song about this girl.’ The line in the song is, ‘Jeanie, why you gotta tell the secrets about my sex life?’ I write how people would talk over a drink.

— Kesha, Billboard

== Music video ==
Prior to the release of Animal in September 2009, Kesha and some of her friends filmed the video throughout the night in downtown Los Angeles. The video was originally leaked in 2011 and was directed by Skinny. The video sees Kesha and her friends running around Echo Park and Silver Lake. It was choreographed by Ryan Heffington, who was still up-and-coming at the time, with rehearsals taking place at his home. RuPaul's Drag Race star, Detox, appears in the video. Visually, Kesha stated that the video reflected a time of her life where it was very authentic to her before she gained fame.

=== Synopsis ===
The video starts off with Kesha and her friend driving up to a payphone. The singer gets out to use it before her friend steals her car. For the first half of the video, she wears a punk-inspired look, consisting of an animal-print leotard and leather jacket. For the final scene, the singer emerges from a cloud of fog with her friends and sports a gold leotard and jacket made of trash bags, along with blue metallic lipstick. In the end, Kesha gets revenge on the friend who stole her car by slapping her.

== Live performances ==
The song has been included on the setlist of several of Kesha's tours. During her 2024 Lollapalooza show, Kesha's prop knife was accidentally switched with a real knife.

== Track listing ==
7-inch vinyl

1. "Backstabber" – 3:06
2. "Cannibal" – 3:14

Digital download and streaming

1. "Backstabber" – 3:06
2. "Backstabber" (alternate lyric mix) – 3:06

== Charts ==
Chart	Peak position
South Korea (Circle)	108

== Certifications ==
Certifications for "Backstabber"
Region	Certification	Certified units/sales
New Zealand (RMNZ)	Gold	15,000^{‡}
United Kingdom (BPI)	Silver	200,000^{‡}
United States (RIAA)	Gold	500,000^{‡}
^{‡} Sales+streaming figures based on certification alone.

== Release history ==
Release dates and formats for "Backstabber"
Region	Date	Format(s)	Labels	Ref.
Various	November 6, 2026	Digital download; streaming	Sony	
Various	January 15, 2027	7-inch vinyl	Sony	
