= Fine Line (Kesha song) =

Single by Kesha

from the album Gag Order
- A-side: "Eat the Acid"
- Released: April 28, 2023
- Studio: Shangri-La
- Length: 3:26
- Label: RCA; Kemosabe
- Songwriters: Kesha Sebert; Pebe Sebert; Ajay Bhattacharya
- Producers: Kesha; Rick Rubin; Jason Lader; Stuart Crichton

Kesha singles chronology
"Drop Dead" (remix) (2021)	"Fine Line" / "Eat the Acid" (2023)	"Only Love Can Save Us Now" (2023)

Visualizer
- "Fine Line" on YouTube

"Fine Line" is a song by American singer-songwriter Kesha from her fifth studio album, Gag Order (2023). The song was released as a dual single alongside "Eat the Acid" on April 28, 2023, as the lead single, ahead of the album's full release on May 19, 2023. An official lyric video was released the same day. The song was written by Kesha, her mother Pebe Sebert, and Stint and produced by Rick Rubin, Stuart Crichton, and Jason Lader. A visualizer was released on May 3, 2023.

== Composition and lyrics ==
The song lasts 3 minutes and 26 seconds and alludes to Kesha's legal battle with her former producer, Dr. Luke. The singer uses wordplay and vents solely on her emotions about the lawsuit, but does not directly refer to it. She references the title of her album with lyrics: "All the doctors and lawyers cut the tongue outta my mouth". Kesha also speaks on the abuses she has endured in the music industry and issues a warning: "This is where you fuckers pushed me / Don't be surprised if shit gets ugly."

== Release and promotion ==
In the months leading up to the song's release, Kesha teased song lyrics in her social media bios and went on to reveal portions of the song to fans across several occasions. On March 8, 2023, she live streamed portions of several songs, including "Fine Line" on Instagram. She also shared a portion of the song on SoundCloud from a since-deleted account, eventually removing the song in the weeks leading up to the official announcement of her album. In celebration with the album's second anniversary, the demo version of "Fine Line" was released.

== Live performances ==
Kesha performed an acoustic version of "Fine Line" that was included in her EP, Gag Order (Live Acoustic EP from Space).

== Release history ==
Release dates and formats for "Fine Line"
Region	Date	Format(s)	Labels	Ref.
Various	April 28, 2023	Digital download; streaming	Kemosabe; RCA	
