= Lila Drew =

- Born: Lila Drew Hauptman; London
- Occupation: Singer-Songwriter
- Musical career
- Genres: Pop, Indie Pop
- Labels: AWAL
- Website: liladrew.com

Lila Drew Hauptman is an English-American singer-songwriter. She signed to AWAL Recordings and released her debut album "All The Places I Could Be" in 2022. Lila is managed by Three Six Zero which is co-founded by Mark Gillespie.

== Early life ==
Drew was born in London and raised in Los Angeles. From an early age, she began studying music and learning piano. As a teenager, Lila was signed to Roc Nation Management where she was managed from 2018 to 2021. Drew is studying at Yale University, where she is completing a degree in American Studies.

== Career ==
=== 2018: Debut single ===
In 2018, Lila released her first single "Faded/2 am" featuring rapper, Goldlink. The single was premiered by Zane Lowe on Beats 1.

=== 2019: Locket (side one) ===
In 2019, her EP "Locket (side one)” gained attention on streaming platforms and music outlets, was listed by Glamour UK as one of "2020's newcomers". She worked with producer Matt Hales (also known as Aqualung) in London.

=== 2022: All The Places I Could Be ===
In November 2022, Lila Drew released her first studio album "All The Places I Could Be”. The album was co-written and produced with collaborators Sachi DiSerafino, Jordan Reyes, Swagg R’Celious, Shae Taylor, and Matt Hales. Singles on the album included Crystal Ball, Used To, and Bad Juice.

In November 2022 Lila collaborated with music video director Vincent Haycock to make a music video for her album stand-out track, "Used To". Later this single was prominently featured in The Other Zoey.

Vincent Haycock also directed the videos for "Bad Juice" and "Lila's Theme" which were shot in Mexico City at Luis Barragan's House(s).

In summer 2023, Lila Drew performed at Primavera and The Great Escape

== Discography ==
=== Albums ===
All The Places I Could Be; November 11, 2022; AWAL.

=== Singles ===
- Faded/2am; 2018.
- Dads Van; 2020.
- Locket; 2020.
- Crystal ball; 2021.
- 2023; 2021.
- Bad juice; 2022.
- Lila's theme; 2022.
- Used to; 2022.
- What are you doing; 2022.
- Selfish; 2022.
- Lucky; 2022.
- Places; 2022.
- Magnolia 10; 2022.

== Tours and festivals ==
- Tour with Oh Wonder - Spain, Germany, England, Netherlands, Belgium; 2020.
- The Great Escape Festival - Brighton, UK; 2023.
- Primavera - Barcelona, Spain; 2023.
