= Safe (Sage song) =

2018 song by Sage

Single by Sage featuring Kesha and Chika
- Released: October 12, 2018
- Genre: Pop; alternative R&B; hip hop
- Length: 2:59
- Label: RCA
- Songwriters: Louie Sebert; Kesha Sebert; Pebe Sebert; Drew Pearson; Chika
- Producer: Pearson

Sage singles chronology
"Safe" (2018)	"Gone Baby" (2019)

Kesha singles chronology
"Here Comes The Change" (2018)	"Safe" (2018)	"Raising Hell" (2019)

Chika singles chronology
"Safe" (2018)

Music video
- "Safe ft. Kesha & Chika" on YouTube

"Safe" is a song recorded by American singer Sage. The song features his sister, Kesha, and independent rapper Chika. It was released on October 12, 2018.

== Background ==
"Safe" was written during Sage's senior year of high school after the mass shooting in a high school in Parkland, Florida. He played the first version of the song for his sister, Kesha, who instantly felt the power of the track and wanted to help the cause by lending her voice to the song and movement. Chika is an independent female rapper and contributed the verses to finish the song. The song was released in partnership with the March for Our Lives organization.

Kesha tweeted about the song the day before it was released: "I wrote the song 'Safe' with my younger brother @SageSebert after the tragic mass shooting in Parkland, Florida. This song is coming tomorrow in partnership with @AMarch4OurLives. Let's end senseless gun violence".

== Music video ==
The music video features a school shooting, in a continuing cycle. The song repeats 3 as the whole cycle of the shooting starts again. Each time the song and video replays, there are a slight difference. The signs in the beginning all advocate for gun restriction laws and urging people to vote. The second time it goes through shows names of victims of the Parkland Shooting. The third time it plays displays the lyrics at the bottom of the screen.
