= Regina Regina =

Former Country Music Duo

- Origin: Nashville, Tennessee
- Genres: Country
- Years active: 1995-1997
- Label: Giant
- Past members: Regina Leigh; Regina Nicks

Regina Regina was an American country music duo formed in 1995. The duo consisted of female singers Regina Leigh and Regina Nicks, respectively natives of Marshville, North Carolina and Lufkin, Texas. Leigh was formerly a backing vocalist in Reba McEntire's road band, while Nicks was a personal assistant for McEntire and a former member of Dave & Sugar. The two met through the assistance of producer Wally Wilson, who wanted to include Nicks in a female duo. Nicks felt that she was unable to find a suitable singing partner until Leigh heard one of her demos and decided that she wanted to work with Nicks. The two were brought to Giant Records then-president James Stroud in 1995.

Regina Regina released its only album in 1997. The duo's only charting single in the U.S. was "More Than I Wanted to Know", which peaked at No. 53 on Billboard's Hot Country Singles & Tracks.

== Discography ==
=== Albums ===
Title	Album details
Regina Regina	Release date: January 28, 1997; Label: Giant Records

=== Singles ===
Year	Single	Peak chart positions		Album
Year	Single	US Country	CAN Country	Album
1997	"More Than I Wanted to Know"	53	26	Regina Regina
1997	"Right Plan, Wrong Man"	—	88	Regina Regina
1997	"Asking for the Moon"	—	—	Regina Regina
"—" denotes releases that did not chart

=== Music videos ===
Year	Video	Director
1997	"More Than I Wanted to Know"	Jim Hershleder
1997	"Right Plan, Wrong Man"	Marc Ball
1997	"Asking for the Moon"	Jim Hershleder
