= Ciclope Festival =

International advertising and creative festival

CICLOPE Festival
- Status: Active
- Genre: Advertising, Film Production, Craft, Music Video, Short Film
- Frequency: Annual
- Country: Germany
- Years active: 16
- Inaugurated: 2010 (Buenos Aires); 2013 (Berlin)
- Founder: Francisco Condorelli
- Organizer: CICLOPE
- Website: www.ciclopefestival.com

The CICLOPE Festival (also known as the CICLOPE Festival and Awards) is an international festival and awards event that recognizes craft in advertising, commercials, music videos, brand experiences, digital production, and short films.

CICLOPE was founded by Francisco Condorelli in 2010 in Buenos Aires. The inaugural event of the festival's main Berlin edition was first held in November 2013 at Kino International. It featured an awards ceremony, lectures, case studies, seminars, and workshops. A related event, Craften, had taken place in Amsterdam earlier that same year. The festival has since grown in size and international participation.

The CICLOPE Festival's main edition is held annually in October in Berlin. The main venues for the festival are the Universitat der Kunste Berlin and the Haus der Kulturen der Welt. The event features multiple days of panel discussions, masterclasses, and networking sessions. Previous speakers at the festival include Spike Lee, Paul Rogers, David Droga, and Sir John Hegarty.

The CICLOPE Awards are separated into three sections: CICLOPE Craft, CICLOPE Ideas, and CICLOPE Entertainment. The Awards accept entries across 44 categories, including Original Music, Campaigns, Live Experience, Use of Data & AI, and Unsigned Director. Eligible work may be entered as commercials, music videos, brand experience projects, and digital productions.

Award entries are judged by an international jury composed of directors, producers, marketing executives, and other creative professionals. Winners are announced in a final ceremony in Berlin where special awards, such as Production Company of the Year and Director of the Year, are also awarded. The 2025 edition of the CICLOPE Awards received 1,800 entries from 39 countries.

Notable winners include David Fincher, Jay-Z, and RM.
