= Eat the Acid =

Single by Kesha

from the album Gag Order
- A-side: "Fine Line"
- Released: April 28, 2023
- Studio: Shangri-La
- Genre: Dark wave
- Length: 4:02
- Label: RCA; Kemosabe
- Songwriters: Kesha Sebert; Pebe Sebert; Stuart Crichton
- Producers: Kesha; Rick Rubin; Jason Lader; Crichton

Kesha singles chronology
"Drop Dead" (Remix) (2021)	"Fine Line" / "Eat the Acid" (2023)	"Only Love Can Save Us Now" (2023)

Visualizer
- "Eat the Acid" on YouTube

"Eat the Acid" is a song by American singer-songwriter Kesha from her fifth studio album, Gag Order (2023). It was released as the lead single for the album, as a double A-side alongside "Fine Line", on April 28, 2023, ahead of the album's full release on May 19, 2023. An accompanying visualizer was released the same day. The song was written by Kesha, her mother Pebe Sebert, and Stuart Crichton. According to Kesha, the song was originally the album's title track, and the album was later retitled from Gag Order to Eat the Acid on streaming platforms in 2025.

== Background ==
"Eat the Acid" was the first song to be written for the album, before the album released “Eat the Acid” was supposed to be album name. It was after Kesha had a spiritual awakening during the coronavirus pandemic. The title refers to advice that her mother gave her about not taking acid as it showed her "too much", and the lyrics speak about Kesha's mother telling her not to take LSD as well, so that she wouldn't experience what she experienced, even if she did anyways (as she stated in the Zach Sang Show interview).

== Composition and lyrics ==
The song lasts 4 minutes and 2 seconds, and is described as a dark-wave minimalist composition that makes use of auto-tuned vocals, and uses bass guitars, drum machines, synthesizers and a piano. The song is in minor-key and the singer sings over wheezing synths and a bass rumble: "I searched for answers all my life / Dead in the dark, I saw the light."

== Release and promotion ==
In the months leading up to the song's release, Kesha revealed portions of the song to fans across several occasions. In November 2022, a six-second snippet of the song was posted online. On March 8, 2023, she live streamed portions of several songs, including "Eat the Acid", on Instagram. She also shared a portion of the song on SoundCloud from a since-deleted account, eventually removing the song in the weeks leading up to the official announcement of her album.

== Accolades ==
Select year-end rankings of "Eat the Acid"
Publication	List	Rank	Ref.
Los Angeles Times	The 100 Best Songs of 2023	—N/a	
Stereogum	The Top 40 Pop Songs of 2023	16	
Variety	The Best Songs of 2023	26	
Vulture	The Best Songs of 2023	—N/a	

== Release history ==
Release dates and formats for "Eat the Acid"
Region	Date	Format(s)	Labels	Ref.
Various	April 28, 2023	Digital download; streaming	Kemosabe; RCA	
