= Pebe Sebert =

American singer and songwriter

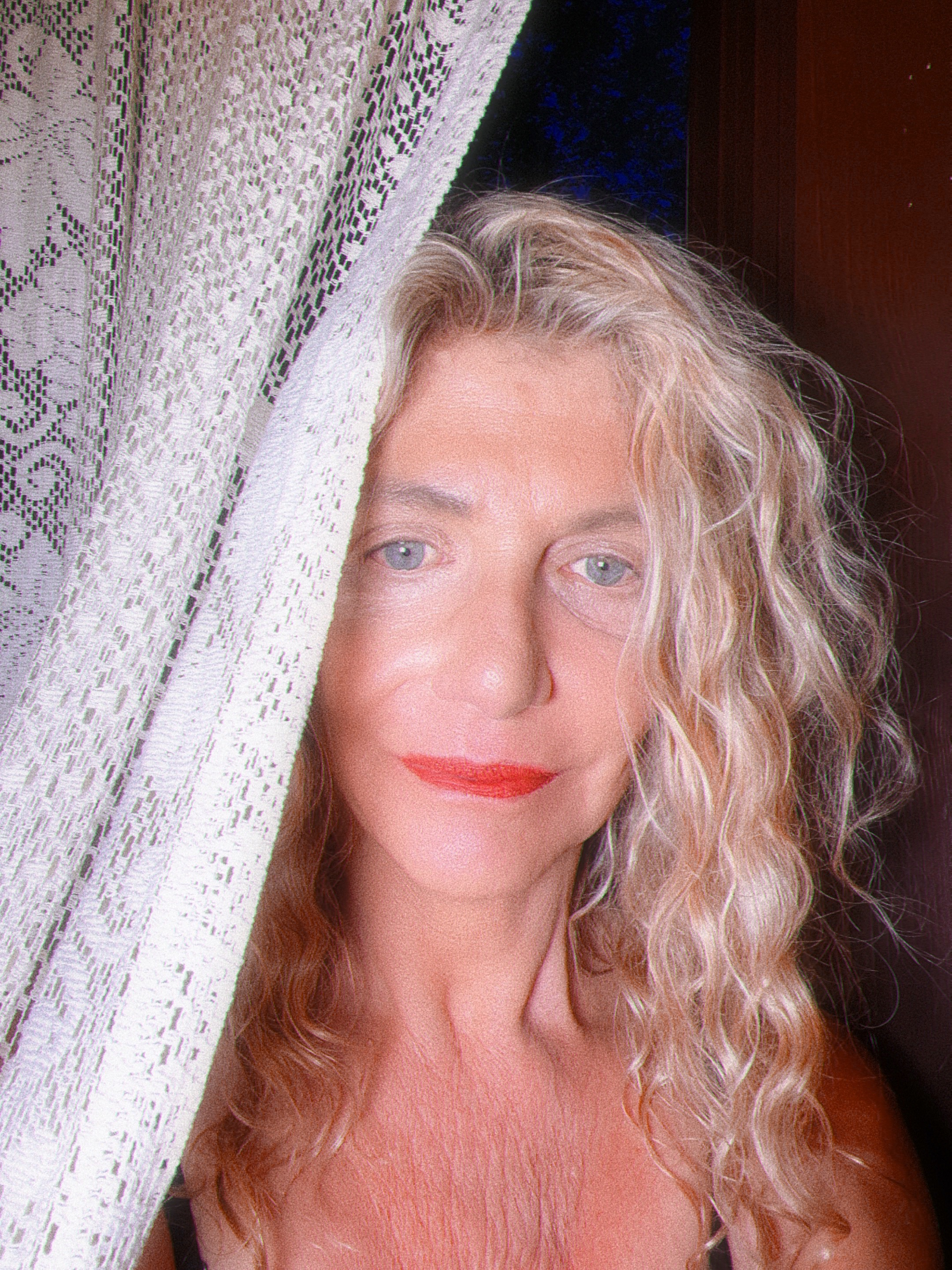
- Sebert in 2021
- Born: Rosemary Patricia Sebert; March 17, 1956 (age 70); Michigan City, Indiana, U.S.
- Other names: Patricia Rose Sebert; P. Sebert; Sebert; D. Sebert; Pebe Seber
- Spouse: Hugh Moffat (m. 1977; div. 1984)
- Children: 3, including Kesha
- Musical career
- Genres: Pop; country; dance-pop; pop rock
- Occupations: Singer; songwriter
- Instruments: Vocals; piano; guitar
- Works: List of songs written
- Years active: 1976–present

Rosemary Patricia "Pebe" Sebert (/ˈpiːbi ˈsɛbərt/ PEE-bee SEB-ərt; born March 17, 1956) is an American singer and songwriter from Brentwood, Tennessee, and the mother of pop singer Kesha. Sebert has co-written number-one hits for Dolly Parton, Pitbull, and Kesha, her daughter. Sebert and Kesha have written 11 published songs together. The songs Sebert wrote for other artists have combined sales of over 8 million copies in the United States. In 2013, Sebert appeared as a regular on reality show Kesha: My Crazy Beautiful Life, which starred Kesha and was filmed by her son Lagan. Sebert released her self-titled debut album on December 12, 2025, through her daughter's independent record label, Kesha Records.

== Early life and education ==
Sebert was born on March 17, 1956, in Michigan City, Indiana, and her early years were spent on her parents' farm. She is of German and Hungarian descent. Pebe began singing and making up songs at age 4 and singing publicly by age six, and she trained as a singer and played piano and guitar. She sang in groups, bands, and as a solo artist. Sebert entered the Interlochen Arts Academy at age 15, where she participated in the Madrigal group, which toured by invitation in Europe. She also toured as a soprano with the American Youth Symphony and Choir. She began playing coffeehouses in Chicago and Europe throughout her high school years.

== Career ==
In the 1970s, Sebert wrote "Old Flames Can't Hold a Candle to You" with then-husband Hugh Moffatt for American Country singer Joe Sun for his album Old Flames. Sun's version soon became a hit, peaking at No. 14 on the Billboard Hot Country Songs chart. Dolly Parton included a cover of the song on her 1980 album Dolly, Dolly, Dolly two years after Sun's version was released. Parton's version became a huge hit, reaching No. 1 on the Billboard Hot Country Songs chart. "Old Flames Can't Hold a Candle to You" was later covered by many artists, including Sebert's daughter Kesha for her extended play Deconstructed and her third studio album Rainbow.

In 2004, Sebert lent her vocals on X-Mas Balls' debut holiday album, She Left Me For Rudolph, singing "If I Was an Angel" with Ned McElroy and Jerry Williams.

In May 2005, Sebert and her two children Kesha and Lagan starred in an episode of the reality series The Simple Life which starred Paris Hilton and Nicole Richie. In the May 12, 2005 episode "The Wedding Planner," Sebert lets Hilton and Richie stay at her house while they attempt to plan a wedding and eventually try, with Kesha's help, to set Sebert up on a date.

In 2010, Sebert co-wrote her daughter Kesha's hit song "Your Love Is My Drug", which became a Top 10 single in nine countries and reached triple-platinum in the U.S. Later that year, Sebert and Kesha gave the song "Disgusting" to pop singer Miranda Cosgrove for her debut album, and contributed the title track for Miley Cyrus's debut EP, The Time of Our Lives.

In 2012, Sebert co-wrote "Warrior", "Dirty Love", "Wonderland", "Gold Trans Am", and "Out Alive" for Kesha's second album Warrior. Sebert also provided backing vocals for the tracks "Dirty Love", which featured Iggy Pop, and "Gold Trans Am".

In April 2013, Sebert appeared on Kesha's reality show Kesha: My Crazy Beautiful Life which was filmed by her son Lagan Sebert and aired on MTV. The first season (April 23, 2013 – May 28, 2013) documented Kesha's life as she embarked on her first solo tour and worked on her second album, Warrior. The second season featured Kesha spending more time at home taking a much-needed break, and featured Sebert's youngest son and Kesha's youngest brother, Louie, who hadn't appeared in the first season. Season two ran from October 30 to December 18, 2013.

In 2013, Sebert co-wrote Kesha and American rapper Pitbull's hit single "Timber", which was released on October 2, 2013, and became a Top 10 single in 28 countries and No. 1 in 12 countries.

On December 31, 2013, Kesha released a music video for "Dirty Love", which Sebert had co-written and for which she contributed vocals.

In 2017, Sebert co-produced Kesha's comeback album Rainbow which features two new tracks co-written by the duo ("Hymn" and "Learn to Let Go"), as well as a duet of "Old Flames Can't Hold a Candle to You", between Kesha and Parton. Sebert co-wrote the duet "Safe" with Kesha and her son Louie, who performed it alongside indie rapper Chika.

Following the releases of "Vampire" and "Hard Times Ahead" in 2021 and 2022, respectively, Sebert released "City's Burning" as the lead single of her self-titled debut album on November 14, 2025. The album was recorded in the 1980s and released on December 12, 2025, via Kesha Records. It contains 11 tracks, including the three previously released singles.

== Personal life ==
Sebert was married to Hugh Moffatt, with whom she wrote "Old Flames Can't Hold a Candle to You", for seven years, separating in 1984. They had one child together, Lagan Sebert.

On March 1, 1987, Sebert gave birth to daughter Kesha Rose Sebert. Sebert frequently brought Kesha and her brother along to recording studios and encouraged Kesha to sing. She moved the family to Nashville in 1991 after securing a new publishing deal for her songwriting.

Sebert has one adopted son, Louis Sage "Louie" Sebert, who was born on October 12, 1999. He appeared in an episode of the television series Victorious alongside Kesha.

Through Lagan, Pebe has two grandchildren.

Sebert checked into Timberline Knolls Residential Treatment Center in Lemont, Illinois, for rehab in January 2014, claiming that she had post-traumatic stress disorder from the trauma of Kesha being attacked by her record label and Dr. Luke. Sebert has admitted that she is a recovering drug addict and alcoholic and had taken Kesha to Alcoholics Anonymous meetings with her since Kesha was a year old.

== Discography ==
=== Studio albums ===
List of studio albums, with selected details
Title	Details
Pebe Sebert	Release date: December 12, 2025; Label: Kesha; Format: Digital download, streaming, LP

== Awards and nominations ==
BMI Pop Music Awards

- 2010 ("Your Love Is My Drug" Kesha)

== Filmography ==
Television
Year	Title	Role	Notes
2005	The Simple Life	Herself	"Wedding Planner" (Season 3, Episode 15)
2013	Kesha: My Crazy Beautiful Life	Herself	Series regular (14 Episodes)
