= List of songs recorded by Kesha =

Songs by American singer

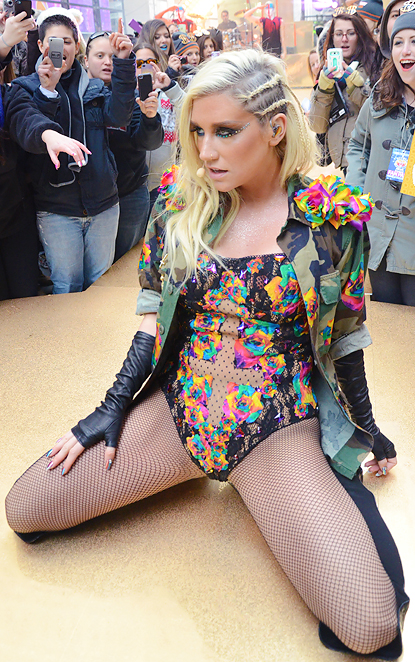
Kesha performing on Today in 2012

American singer and songwriter Kesha made her international debut in early 2009 featuring on the Flo Rida single "Right Round", which reached number one on the Billboard Hot 100 in the United States and topped the charts in five other countries. Kesha's debut album, Animal, released in January 2010, topped the Canadian and American charts, debuting at number one in its first week on the Billboard 200. The album's lead single, and Kesha's solo debut single, "Tik Tok", was released in August 2009 and reached number one in eleven countries and spent nine consecutive weeks on top of the Billboard Hot 100. Since its release in 2009, the song has sold 15 million copies worldwide, therefore making it the best-selling digital single of all time. The album spawned three more hit singles, "Blah Blah Blah", "Your Love Is My Drug" and "Take It Off". She topped eight charts on the 2010 Billboard Year-End Chart, including Top New Artists, Hot 100 Songs and Hot 100 Artists.

The commercial and critical success of her first album led to plans of a deluxe edition of the album titled Cannibal, which was ultimately released as an extended play in November 2010. Its lead single, "We R Who We R", reached the top ten in ten countries, while peaking at number one in the United States, Australia, and United Kingdom. The EP's second and final single, "Blow", was released in February 2011 and also managed to peak inside the top ten of multiple countries.

Kesha released her second studio album, Warrior, in December 2012. The lead single, "Die Young", peaked at number two in the United States, while charting in the top ten of eleven other countries. Two more singles, "C'Mon" and "Crazy Kids", were also released from the album, but failed to match the success of the lead single. In October 2013, she was featured on Pitbull's single, "Timber", which peaked at number one in over fifteen countries, including the United Kingdom, Canada, and United States. In April 2016, she released her first single in three years, a collaboration with Zedd, "True Colors". It is the first song since her ongoing legal battle with producer Dr Luke. 2017 saw the release of Kesha's third studio album, Rainbow, which featured the single "Praying". The single reached no. 22 in the U.S. "Woman" was previously a promotional single but later was released as the second single from the album. Her fourth album, High Road, was released in 2020. Four singles were released from the album: "Raising Hell", "My Own Dance", "Resentment", and "Tonight". Her fifth studio album, Gag Order, was released on May 19, 2023. Two singles were released on the same day ahead of the album's release: "Eat the Acid" and "Fine Line".

== Released songs ==
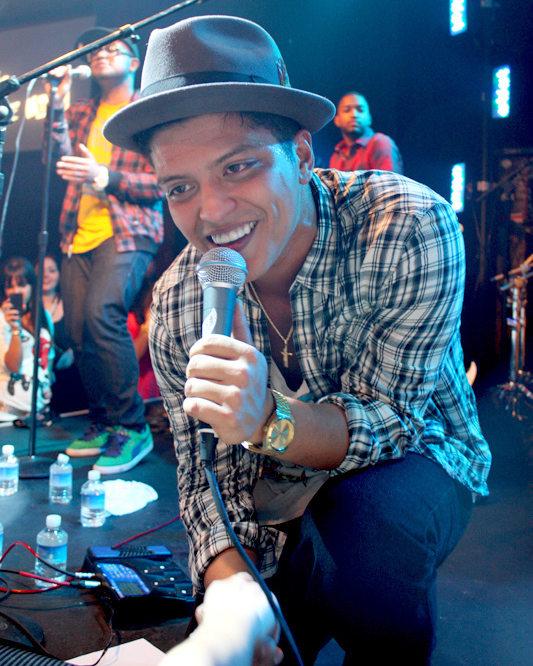
Bruno Mars co-wrote "Right Round".

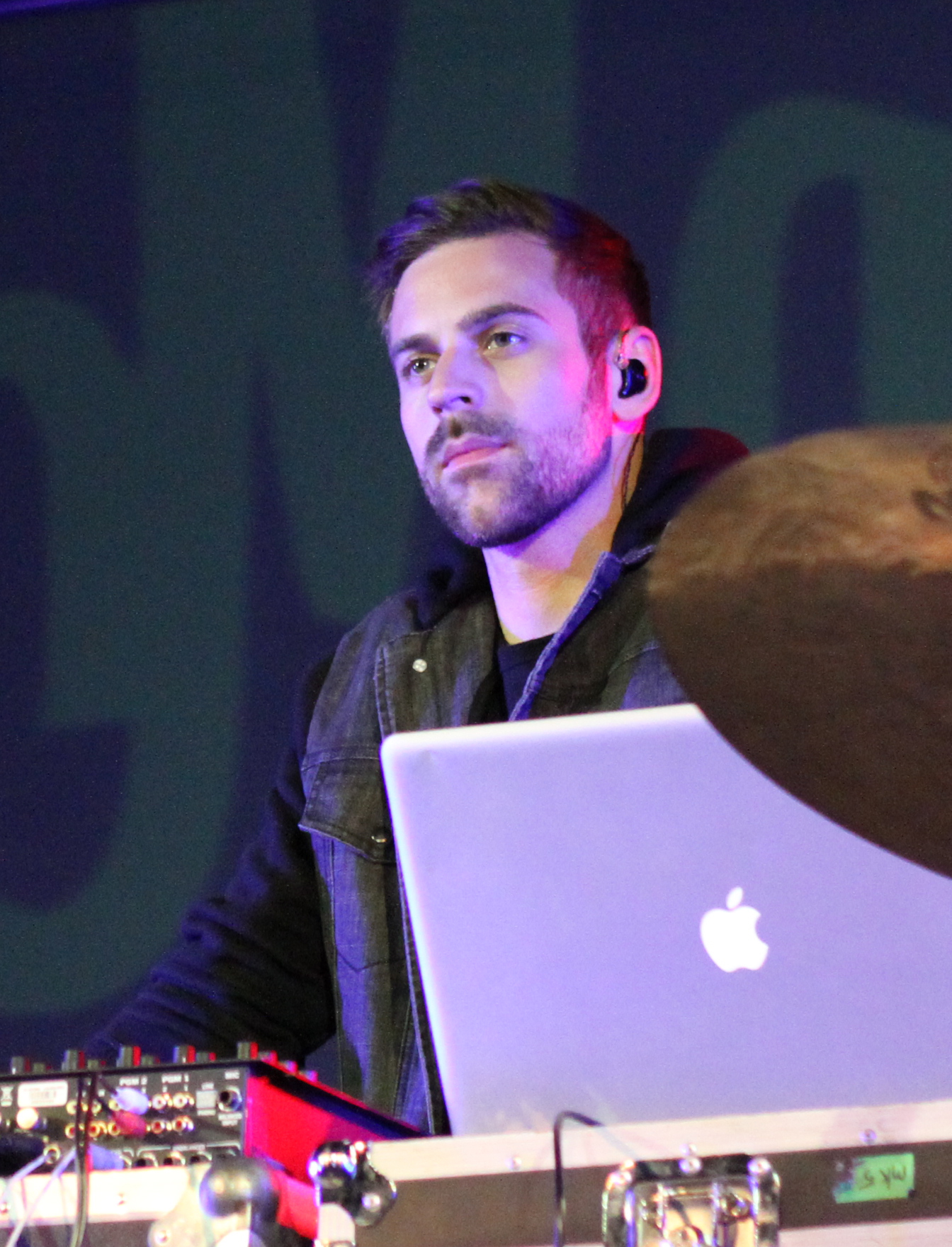
Ryan Lewis co-wrote "Praying".

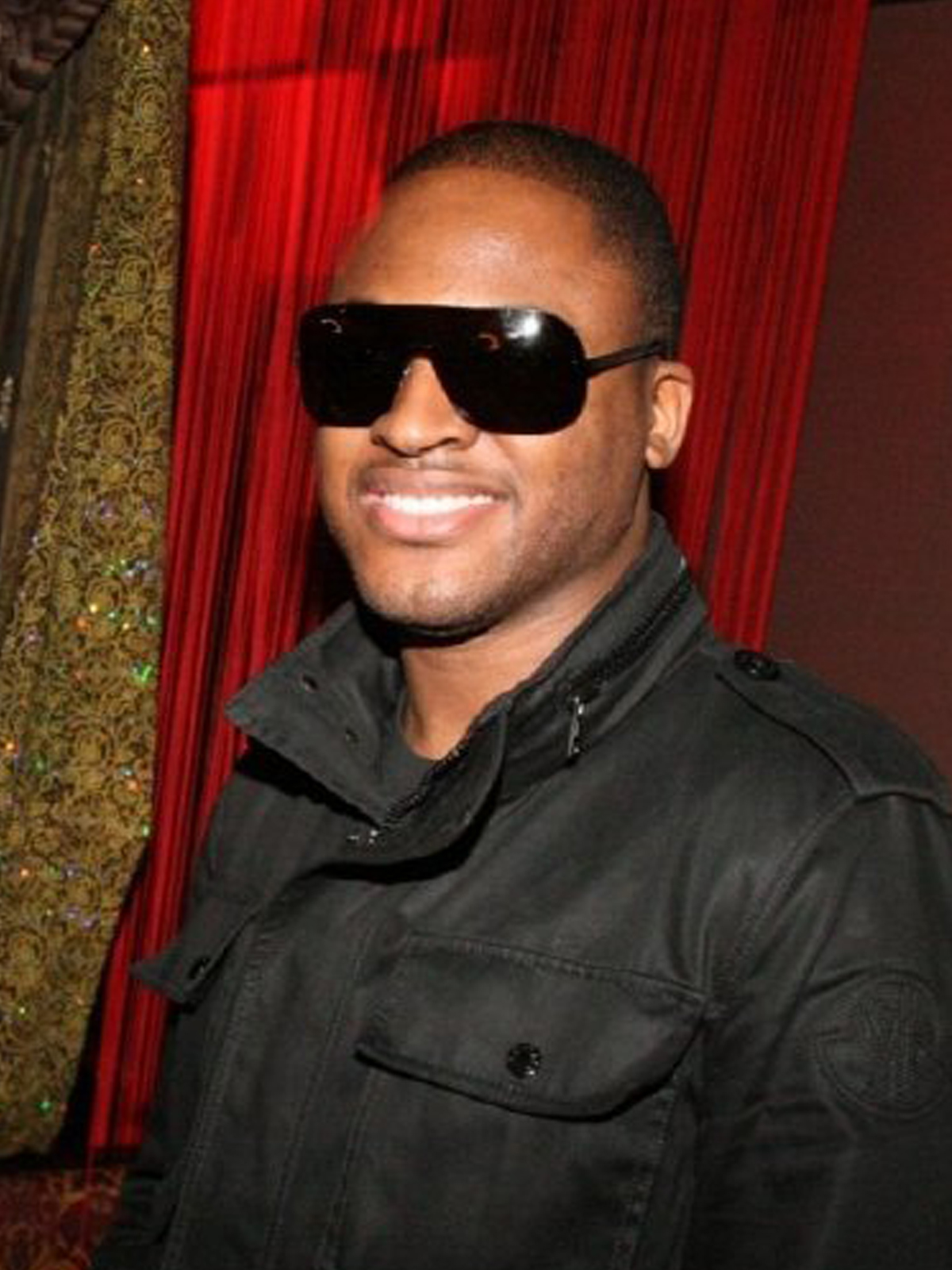
Taio Cruz collaborated with Kesha on "Dirty Picture" and "Dirty Picture Part 2".

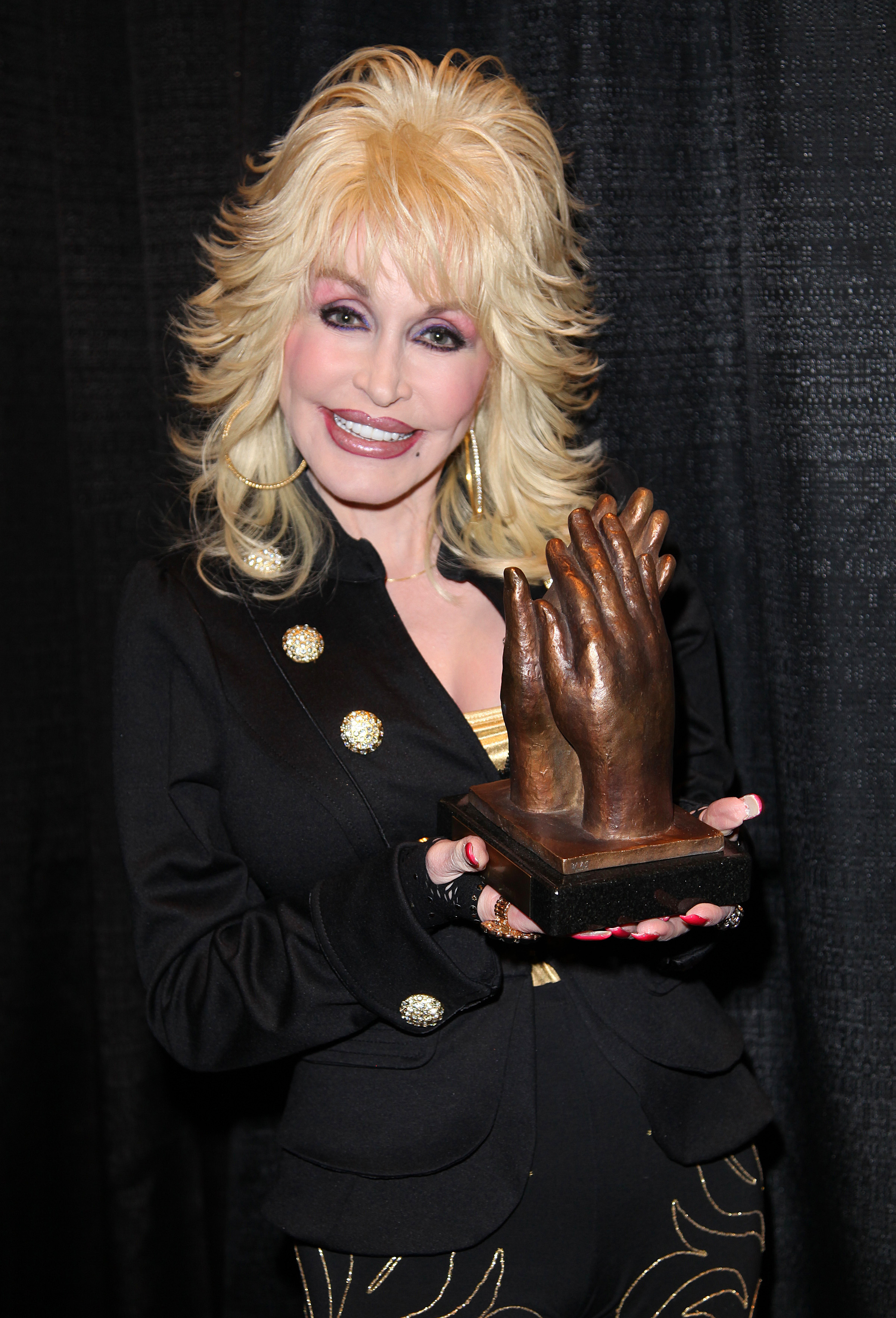
Kesha has recorded two versions of Dolly Parton's "Old Flames Can't Hold a Candle to You", one featuring Parton herself.

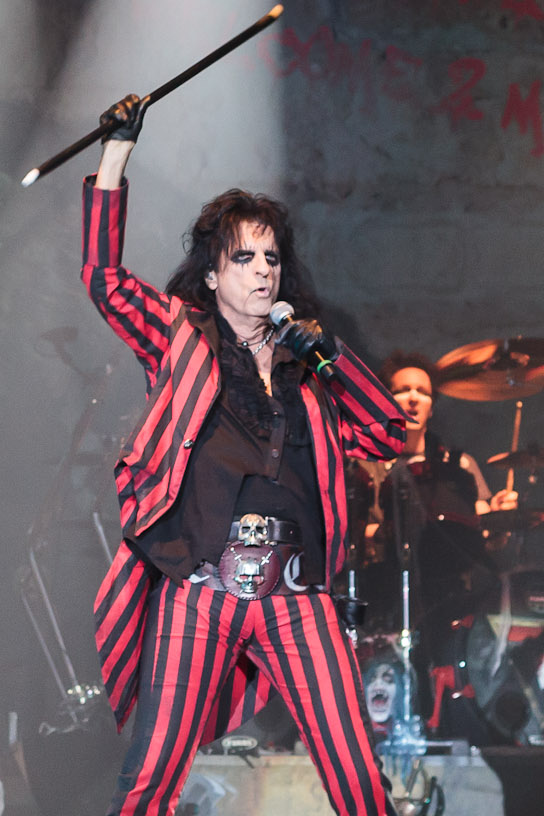
Kesha is featured on the Alice Cooper song "What Baby Wants".

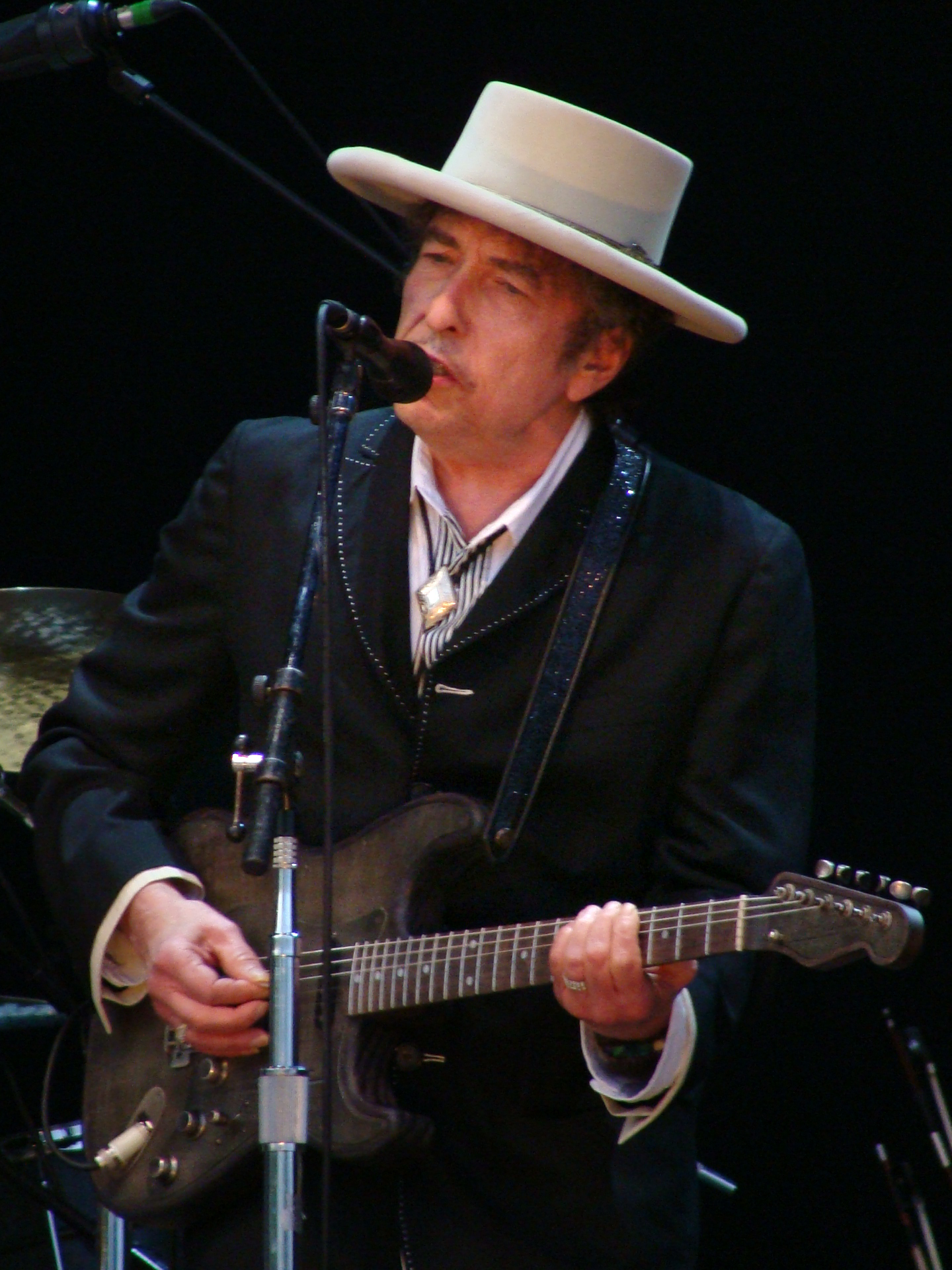
Kesha has covered Bob Dylan's "Don't Think Twice, It's All Right".

Key
†	Indicates single release
‡	Indicates song included on an alternative version of the album
•	Indicates song written solely by Kesha

Title	Artist(s)	Writer(s)	Album	Year	Ref
"2012 (You Must Be Upgraded)"	The Flaming Lips featuring Kesha, Biz Markie, and Hour of the Time Majesty 12	Kesha Sebert; Pebe Sebert; Steven Drozd; Wayne Coyne	The Flaming Lips and Heady Fwends	2012	
"All I Need Is You"	Kesha	Kesha Sebert; Jussi Karvinen; Ajay Bhatacharyya; Rex Kudo; Caroline Pennell; Everett Romano	Gag Order	2023	
"All That Matters (The Beautiful Life)"	Kesha	Kesha Sebert; Karl Johan Schuster; Max Martin; Savan Kotecha; Alexander Kronlund; Lukas Loules	Warrior	2012	
"Animal"	Kesha	Kesha Sebert; Pebe Sebert; Lukasz Gottwald; Greg Kurstin	Animal	2010	
"Attention" †	Kesha featuring Slayyyter & Rose Gray	Kesha Sebert; Leah Kate; Madison Love; Kyle Buckley; Catherine Garner; Rosie May Hudson-Edmonds	Period‡ (Note: Included on the .(...) edition.)	2025	
"Backstabber"	Kesha	Kesha Sebert; David Gamson; Marc Nelkin; Jon Ingoldsby	Animal	2010	
"Bastards"	Kesha	Kesha Sebert •	Rainbow	2017	
"Best Day" (Angry Birds 2 Remix)	Kesha	Kesha Sebert; Ryan Lewis; Stephen Wrabel; Scott Harris; Elan Wright; Josh Rawlings; Phillip Peterson; Saba Samakar	The Angry Birds Movie 2	2019	
"BFF"	Kesha featuring Wrabel	Kesha Sebert; Stuart Crichton; Pebe Sebert; Stephen Wrabel	High Road	2020	
"Big Bad Wolf"	Kesha	Kesha Sebert; Stephen Wrabel; Andrew Pearson	High Road ‡ (Note: Included on the Japanese CD edition.)	2020	
"Birthday Suit"	Kesha	Kesha Sebert; Stuart Crichton; Chelcee Grimes	High Road	2020	
"Blah Blah Blah" †	Kesha featuring 3OH!3	Kesha Sebert; Benjamin Levin; Neon Hitch; Sean Foreman	Animal	2010	
"Blind"	Kesha	Kesha Sebert; Lukasz Gottwald; Benjamin Levin; Joshua Coleman	Animal	2010	
"Blow" †	Kesha	Kesha Sebert; Klas Åhlund; Lukasz Gottwald; Allan Grigg; Benjamin Levin; Max Martin	Cannibal	2010	
"Body Talks" †	The Struts featuring Kesha	Lauren Christy; Jon Levine; Adam Slack; Luke Spiller	Young & Dangerous	2018	
"Boogie Feet"	Kesha featuring Eagles of Death Metal	Kesha Sebert; Andrew Pearson; Pebe Sebert	Rainbow	2017	
"Boombox"	Dirt Nasty featuring Kesha & Wiskazz	Simon Rex; Kesha Sebert; Allan Grigg	Nasty As I Wanna Be	2010	
"Boots"	Kesha	Kesha Sebert; Eric Frederic; Justin Tranter; Rogét Chahayed	Rainbow	2017	
"Boots & Boys"	Kesha	Kesha Sebert; Tom Neville; Olivia Nervo; Miriam Nervo	Animal	2010	
"Boy Crazy" †	Kesha	Kesha Sebert; Madison Love; Kevin "Zhone" Hickey	Period	2025	
"Boy Crazy"	Kesha featuring Jade	Kesha Sebert; Jade Thirlwall; Madison Love; Kevin "Zhone" Hickey	Period ‡	2025	
"Butterscotch"	Kesha	Kesha Sebert; Evan Bogart; Michael Busbee; Michael Linney	Animal + Cannibal ‡ (Note: Included on the 15th Anniversary edition.)	2025	
"C U Next Tuesday"	Kesha	Kesha Sebert; David Gamson; Marc Nelkin	Cannibal and Animal‡ (Note: An uncensored version is included on the Japanese, Australian, and expanded editions of Animal.)	2010	
"C'Mon" †	Kesha	Kesha Sebert; Lukasz Gottwald; Benjamin Levin; Max Martin; Bonnie McKee; Henry Walter	Warrior	2012	
"Cannibal"	Kesha	Kesha Sebert; Joshua Coleman; Mathieu Jomphe; Pebe Sebert	Cannibal	2010	
"Cathedral"	Kesha	Kesha Sebert; Skyler Stonestreet; Morten Ristorp Jensen; Xander Xander	Period	2025	
"Chasing Rainbows" †	Big Freedia featuring Kesha	Adam Pigott; Francisco Javier Bejar; Freddie Ross Jr. Joshua Valle; Michael Fonseca; Rosina Russell; Susannah Powell	Louder	2020	
"Chasing Thunder"	Kesha	Kesha Sebert; Jeff Bhasker; Stephen Wrabel; Louis Schoorl	High Road	2020	
"Children of the Revolution"	Kesha and Steve Weisberg	Marc Bolan	Angelheaded Hipster: The Songs of Marc Bolan and T. Rex	2020	
"Cowboy Blues"	Kesha	Kesha Sebert; Andrew Pearson; Stephen Wrabel; Eric Leva	High Road	2020	
"Crazy Beautiful Life"	Kesha	Kesha Sebert; Pebe Sebert; Lukasz Gottwald; Max Martin	Cannibal	2010	
"Crazy Kids"	Kesha	Kesha Sebert; Lukasz Gottwald; Henry Walter; Benjamin Levin	Warrior	2012	
"Crazy Kids" †	Kesha featuring Juicy J	Kesha Sebert; Lukasz Gottwald; Jordan Houston; Henry Walter; Benjamin Levin	Non-album single (Note: "Crazy Kids" featuring Juicy J or will.i.am were each released as singles from Warrior, however they do not appear on the album's tracklist.)	2012	
"Crazy Kids" †	Kesha featuring will.i.am	Kesha Sebert; Lukasz Gottwald; William Adams; Henry Walter; Benjamin Levin	Non-album single	2012	
"Dancing With Tears In My Eyes"	Kesha	Kesha Sebert; Lukasz Gottwald; Benjamin Levin; Claude Kelly	Animal	2010	
"Dear Me" †	Kesha	Diane Warren	Diane Warren: Relentless	2025	
"Delusional" †	Kesha	Kesha Sebert; Madison Love; Kevin "Zhone" Hickey	Period	2024	
"Die Young" †	Kesha	Kesha Sebert; Benjamin Levin; Henry Walter; Lukasz Gottwald; Nate Ruess	Warrior	2012	
"Dinosaur"	Kesha	Kesha Sebert; Max Martin; Karl Schuster	Animal	2010	
"Dirty Love"	Kesha featuring Iggy Pop	Kesha Sebert; James Osterberg; Lukasz Gottwald; Pebe Sebert; Matt Squire; Henry Walter	Warrior	2012	
"Dirty Picture" †	Taio Cruz featuring Kesha	Taio Cruz; Fraser T Smith	Rokstarr	2009	
"Dirty Picture"	Taio Cruz featuring Kesha and Fabolous	Taio Cruz; Fraser T Smith	Rokstarr	2009	
"Dirty Pictures Pt. 2"	Kesha featuring Taio Cruz	Taio Cruz; Fraser T Smith; Kesha Sebert; Lukasz Gottwald; Benjamin Levin	Animal ‡ (Note: Included on the UK edition.)	2010	
"Don't Think Twice, It's All Right"	Kesha	Bob Dylan	Chimes of Freedom: The Songs of Bob Dylan Honoring 50 Years of Amnesty International	2012	
"Drop Dead" †	Grandson, Kesha, and Travis Barker	Jordan Benjamin; Travis Barker; Chester Krupa Carbone; Kevin Hissink; Kesha Sebert	Non-album single	2021	
"Eat the Acid" †	Kesha	Kesha Sebert; Pebe Sebert; Stuart Crichton	Gag Order	2023	
"Elizabeth My Dear"	The Flaming Lips featuring Kesha and the New Fumes	Ian Brown; John Squire	The Time Has Come to Shoot You Down... What a Sound	2013	
"Emotional"	Kesha	Kesha Sebert; Stephen Wrabel	Rainbow ‡	2017	
"Fancy Like" (remix) †	Walker Hayes featuring Kesha	Walker Hayes; Cameron Bartolini; Josh Jenkins; Shane Stevens; Kesha Sebert		2021	
"Father Daughter Dance"	Kesha	Kesha Sebert; Andrew Pearson	High Road	2020	
"Finding You"	Kesha	Kesha Sebert; Eric Frederic; Justin Tranter	Rainbow	2017	
"Fine Line" †	Kesha	Kesha Sebert; Pebe Sebert; Ajay Bhatacharyya	Gag Order	2023	
"Freedom"	Kesha	Kesha Sebert; Drew Erickson; Jonathan Wilson	Period	2025	
"Fuck Him He's a DJ"	Kesha	Kesha Sebert; Tom Neville; Olivia Nervo; Miriam Nervo	I Am the Dance Commander + I Command You to Dance: The Remix Album	2011	
"Good Old Days" †	Macklemore featuring Kesha	Kesha Sebert; Benjamin Haggerty	GEMINI	2017	
"Girls"	Pitbull featuring Kesha	Lukasz Gottwald; Joshua Coleman	Pitbull Starring in Rebelution	2009	
"Glow"	Kesha	Kesha Sebert	Period	2025	
"Godzilla"	Kesha	Pebe Sebert; Claire Wilkinson; Nathan Chapman	Rainbow	2017	
"Gold Trans Am"	Kesha	Kesha Sebert; Lukasz Gottwald; Allan Grigg; Pebe Sebert; Henry Walter	Warrior ‡	2012	
"Grow a Pear"	Kesha	Kesha Sebert; Lukasz Gottwald; Benjamin Levin; Max Martin	Cannibal	2010	
"Happy"	Kesha	Kesha Sebert; Blake Slatkin; Skyler Stonestreet	Gag Order	2023	
"Hate Me Harder"	Kesha	Kesha Sebert; Jussi Karvinen; Ajay Bhatacharyya; Kennedi Lykken; Justin Tranter; Caroline Pennell	Gag Order	2023	
"Here Comes the Change" †	Kesha	Kesha Sebert; Andrew Pearson; Stephen Wrabel	On the Basis of Sex	2018	
"High Road"	Kesha	Kesha Sebert; Jeff Bhasker; Nate Ruess; Wrabel	High Road	2020	
"Holiday Road" †	Kesha	Lindsey Buckingham		2024	
"Honey"	Kesha	Kesha Sebert; Stuart Crichton; Chelcee Grimes; Taylor Parks	High Road	2020	
"Hungover"	Kesha	Kesha Sebert; Max Martin; Karl Johan Schuster; Lukasz Gottwald	Animal	2010	
"Hunt You Down"	Kesha	Kesha Sebert; Richard Nowels	Rainbow	2017	
"Hymn"	Kesha	Kesha Sebert; Cara Salimando; Eric Frederic; Jonny Price; Pebe Sebert	Rainbow	2017	
"I Need A Woman to Love"	Kesha	Sam Andrew; Janis Joplin	Universal Love - Wedding Songs Reimagined	2018	
"Invisible"	Kesha	Chris Pelcer; Martin Briley	The Barbie Diaries Soundtrack	2006	
"Joyride" †	Kesha	Kesha Sebert; Madison Love; Kevin Hickey	Period	2024	
"Kinky"	Kesha featuring Ke$ha	Kesha Sebert; Ajay Bhattacharya; Stephen Wrabel; Sean Douglas	High Road	2020	
"Kiss n Tell"	Kesha	Kesha Sebert; Max Martin; Karl Johan Schuster; Lukasz Gottwald	Animal	2010	
"Last Goodbye"	Kesha	Kesha Sebert; Benjamin Levin; Ammar Malik; Dan Omelio; Henry Walter	Warrior ‡	2012	
"Learn to Let Go" †	Kesha	Kesha Sebert; Stuart Crichton; Pebe Sebert	Rainbow	2017	
"Let 'em Talk"	Kesha featuring Eagles of Death Metal	Kesha Sebert; Stuart Crichton; James Newman	Rainbow	2017	
"Little Bit of Love"	Kesha	Kesha Sebert; Stephen Wrabel; Nate Ruess; Ajay Bhattacharya	High Road	2020	
"Living in My Head"	Kesha	Kesha Sebert Ross Birchard; Gabriella Grombacher; Everett Romano; Rick Rubin	Gag Order	2023	
"Love Forever"	Kesha	Kesha Sebert Pebe Sebert Stuart Crichton	Period	2025	
"Love Into the Light"	Kesha	Kesha Sebert •	Warrior	2012	
"Made of Stone"	The Flaming Lips featuring Kesha and Stardeath and White Dwarfs	Ian Brown; John Squire	The Time Has Come to Shoot You Down... What a Sound	2013	
"Miami Nights"	Dirt Nasty featuring Kesha and Benji Hughes	Simon Rex; Allan Grigg; Kesha Sebert; Benji Hughes	Nasty as I Wanna Be	2010	
"My First Kiss" †	3OH!3 featuring Kesha	Lukasz Gottwald; Sean Foreman; Nathaniel Motte; Benjamin Levin	Streets of Gold	2010	
"My Own Dance" †	Kesha	Kesha Sebert; John Hill; Justin Tranter; Dan Reynolds	High Road	2019	
"Nothing without Your Love"	Kesha	Kesha; Drew Pearson		2021	
"Nicolas Cage"	Kesha	Kesha Sebert		2020	
"Old Flames Can't Hold a Candle to You"	Kesha	Pebe Sebert; Hugh Moffatt	Deconstructed - EP	2012	
"Old Flames Can't Hold a Candle to You"	Kesha featuring Dolly Parton	Pebe Sebert; Hugh Moffatt	Rainbow	2017	
"The One"	Kesha	Kesha Sebert; Zhone	Period	2025	
"Only Love Can Save Us Now" †	Kesha	Kesha Sebert; Jussi Karvinen; Ajay Bhatacharyya	Gag Order	2023	
"Only Love Reprise"	Kesha	Kesha Sebert; Jussi Karvinen; Ajay Bhatacharyya; Rick Rubin; VantaBlaqJungleKat	Gag Order	2023	
"Only Wanna Dance With You"	Kesha featuring The Strokes	Kesha Sebert; Lukasz Gottwald; Max Martin; Henry Walter	Warrior	2012	
"Out Alive"	Kesha	Kesha Sebert; Joshua Coleman; Mathieu Jomphe; Pebe Sebert	Warrior ‡	2012	
"Party at a Rich Dude's House"	Kesha	Kesha Sebert; Karl Johan Schuster; Benjamin Levin	Animal	2010	
"Past Lives"	Kesha	Kesha Sebert •	Warrior ‡	2012	
"Peace & Quiet"	Kesha	Kesha Sebert; Ross Birchard; Kennedi Lykken; Kathleen Brady Ross	Gag Order	2023	
"The Potato Song (Cuz I Want To)"	Kesha	Kesha Sebert; Stuart Crichton; Pebe Sebert	High Road	2020	
"Praying" †	Kesha	Kesha Sebert; Ryan Lewis; Ben Abraham; Andrew Joslyn	Rainbow	2017	
"Rainbow"	Kesha	Kesha Sebert •	Rainbow	2017	
"Raising Hell" †	Kesha featuring Big Freedia	Kesha Sebert; Stephen Wrabel; Ajay Bhattacharya; Sean Douglas	High Road	2019	
"Red Flag"	Kesha	Kesha Sebert; Skyler Stonestreet; Caroline Pennell; Ajay Bhattacharyya	Period	2025	
"Resentment" †	Kesha featuring Brian Wilson, Sturgill Simpson, and Wrabel	Kesha Sebert; Stephen Wrabel; Madi Diaz; Jamie Floyd	High Road	2019	
"Rich, White, Straight Men" †	Kesha	Kesha Sebert; Pebe Sebert; Stuart Crichton; Stephen Wrabel	Non-album single	2019	
"Right Round" †	Flo Rida featuring Kesha	Tramar Dillard; Lukasz Gottwald; Allan Grigg; Justin Franks; Philip Lawrence; Bruno Mars; Aaron Bay-Schuck; Dead or Alive	R.O.O.T.S.	2009	
"Safe" †	Sage featuring Kesha & Chika	Kesha Sebert; Louie Sebert; Pebe Sebert; Drew Pearson; Chika	Non-album single	2018	
"Shadow"	Kesha	Kesha Sebert; Andrew Pearson; Pebe Sebert	High Road	2020	
"Shots on the Hood of My Car"	Kesha	Kesha Sebert; Sophie Stern; David Gamson; Pebe Sebert	Animal + Cannibal (15th Anniversary Edition)	2025	
"Since I Was Young" †	Wrabel with Kesha	Stephen Wrabel; Kesha Sebert; Ajay Bhattacharya	Non-album single	2020	
"Sleazy"	Kesha	Kesha Sebert; Lukasz Gottwald; Benjamin Levin; Shondrae Crawford; Klas Åhlund	Cannibal	2010	
"Something to Believe In"	Kesha	Kesha Sebert; Pebe Sebert; Stuart Crichton	Gag Order	2023	
"Spaceship"	Kesha	Kesha Sebert; Andrew Pearson; Pebe Sebert	Rainbow	2017	
"Spring Breakers" (remix)	Charli XCX featuring Kesha	Charlotte Aitchinson; Kesha Sebert; Alexander Guy Cook; Finn Keane; Jonathan Christopher Shave	Brat and It's Completely Different but Also Still Brat	2024	
"Stand By Your Man"	Kesha	Billy Sherrill; Tammy Wynette		2021	
"Stephen"	Kesha	Kesha Sebert; David Gamson; Pebe Sebert; Oliver Leiber	Animal	2010	
"Stronger" †	Sam Feldt featuring Kesha	Sam Renders; Kesha Sebert; Ryan Lewis; Adam Friedman; Dominic Anthony Lyttle; Joshua Robert Rawlings; Patrick Martin; Pete Nappi; Dom Lyttle; Petey Martin		2021	
"Summer"	Kesha	Kesha Sebert; Ryan Lewis; Bill Danoff; Taylor Parks	High Road ‡	2020	
"Supernatural"	Kesha	Kesha Sebert; Lukasz Gottwald; Nik Kershaw; Max Martin; Bonnie McKee; Henry Walter	Warrior	2012	
"Take It Off" †	Kesha	Kesha Sebert; Lukasz Gottwald; Claude Kelly	Animal	2010	
"Taste So Good (The CANN Song)"	VINCINT, Hayley Kiyoko, MNEK, and Kesha	Leland		2022	
"The Drama"	Kesha	Kesha Sebert; Shawn Everett; Drew Pearson; Dee Dee Ramone; Joey Ramone; Kurt Vile; Johnny Ramone	Gag Order	2023	
"The Harold Song"	Kesha	Kesha Sebert; Joshua Coleman	Cannibal	2010	
"They's a Person of the World" †	Black Lips featuring Kesha		Non-album single	2020	
"Thinking of You"	Kesha	Kesha Sebert; Klas Åhlund; Lukasz Gottwald; Benjamin Levin; Ammar Malik; Dan Omelio; Henry Walter	Warrior	2012	
"This Is Me" †	Kesha	Benj Pasek; Justin Paul	The Greatest Showman: Reimagined	2017	
"This Is Me (The Reimagined Remix)"	Keala Settle; Kesha; Missy Elliott	Benj Pasek; Justin Paul; Melissa Elliott	The Greatest Showman: Reimagined	2018	
"TiK ToK" †	Kesha	Kesha Sebert; Lukasz Gottwald; Benjamin Levin	Animal	2010	
"Till the World Ends (The Femme Fatale Remix)" †	Britney Spears featuring Kesha and Nicki Minaj	Lukasz Gottwald, Alexander Kronlund, Max Martin, Kesha Sebert, Onika Maraj	Femme Fatale	2011	
"Timber" †	Pitbull featuring Kesha	Kesha Sebert; Armando C. Pérez; Lukasz Gottwald; Aaron Davis Arnold; Priscilla Hamilton; Jamie Sanderson; Breyan Stanley Isaac; Henry Walter; Pebe Sebert; Lee Oskar; Keri Oskar; Greg Errico; Steve Arrington; Charles Carter; Waung Hankerson; Roger Parker	Meltdown - EP	2013	
"Tonight" †	Kesha	Kesha Sebert; Stephen Wrabel; Ajay Bhattacharya	High Road	2020	
"Too Far Gone"	Kesha	Kesha Sebert; Drew Pearson; Skyler Stonestreet	Gag Order	2023	
"Too Hard"	Kesha	Kesha Sebert; Pebe Sebert; Crichton	Period	2025	
"Touch Me"	Flo Rida featuring Kesha	Tramar Dillard; Kesha Sebert; Lukasz Gottwald; Benjamin Levin	R.O.O.T.S.	2009	
"Trashman"	Kesha	Kesha Sebert; Ross Birchard; Skyler Stonestreet; Heavy Mellow	. (...) ‡	2025	
"True Colors" †	Zedd featuring Kesha	Anton Zaslavski; Antonina Armato; Tim James; Kesha Sebert	True Colors	2016	
"VIP"	Kesha	Kesha Sebert; Tom Neville; Olivia Nervo; Miriam Nervo	Animal ‡ (Note: Included on international editions)	2010	
"Walked on Water"	Morgan Wade featuring Kesha	Morgan Wade	Obsessed	2024	
"Warrior"	Kesha	Kesha Sebert; Lukasz Gottwald; Max Martin; Pebe Sebert; Henry Walter	Warrior	2012	
"We R Who We R" †	Kesha	Kesha Sebert; Joshua Coleman; Lukasz Gottwald; Jacob Kasher Hindlin; Benjamin Levin	Cannibal	2010	
"What Baby Wants"	Alice Cooper featuring Kesha	Alice Cooper; Bob Ezrin; Tommy Henriksen; Kesha Sebert	Welcome 2 My Nightmare	2011	
"Wherever You Are"	Kesha	Kesha Sebert; Lukasz Gottwald; Max Martin; Henry Walter	Warrior	2012	
"Woman" †	Kesha featuring The Dap-Kings Horns	Kesha Sebert; Andrew Pearson; Stephen Wrabel	Rainbow	2017	
"Wonderland"	Kesha featuring Patrick Carney	Kesha Sebert; Lukasz Gottwald; Allan Grigg; Pebe Sebert; Henry Walter	Warrior	2012	
"Yippee-Ki-Yay" †	Kesha featuring T-Pain	Kesha Sebert; Brittany Coney; Denisia Andrews; Faheen Najm; Kyle Buckley	Period	2025	
"Your Love Is My Drug" †	Kesha	Kesha Sebert; Pebe Sebert; Joshua Coleman	Animal	2010	
