= Tonight (Kesha song) =

2020 single by Kesha

Single by Kesha

from the album High Road
- Released: January 28, 2020
- Studio: The Village Recorder (Los Angeles, CA); Venice Way Studios (Venice, CA)
- Genre: Pop; electropop; EDM; hip hop
- Length: 3:15
- Label: Kemosabe; RCA
- Songwriters: Ajay Bhattacharya; Kesha Sebert; Stephen Wrabel
- Producer: Stint

Kesha singles chronology
| "Resentment" (2019) | "Tonight" (2020) | "Chasing Rainbows" (2020) |

Audio video
- "Tonight" on YouTube

"Tonight" is a song by American singer Kesha, which was released as the fourth and final single from her fourth studio album, High Road, on January 28, 2020.

== Background ==
On October 21, 2019, a trailer for Kesha's High Road album premiered on her YouTube channel. In it, snippets of "Tonight" were featured, along with other songs from the album ("Raising Hell", "My Own Dance", "High Road"). Kesha posted a video to her TikTok account, which shows her and co-writer Wrabel lip-syncing and dancing to the track.

The song premiered as the third promotional single off of High Road on January 28, 2020, 3 days before the album's release. During her Halloween party, sponsored by Jack Daniels, she previewed the song to the partygoers. In the description for the album on Apple Music, Kesha wrote about the song, "When I first started making the record, I wasn't so sure how honest I could be about who I am and where I'm at in my life. I didn't want to take away from or minimize what I've been through by coming out with songs that are about me going out and having fun. And it took me a little bit of time to really come to terms with the fact that I don't owe it to anybody to be eternally miserable. It's kind of a sound-fuckery, because you think it's going to be a ballad and then it goes into me doing my shit-talking—kind of a quintessential off-of-my-first-record thing that I purposefully left off of Rainbow. This is a record for my fans, because they have been there for me through all of the bullshit I've gone through and I just wanted them to know I'm back and I'm ready to have a fucking amazing night and tonight's the night to do that. That's what I wanted to open the record with."

== Composition ==
"Tonight" is a "bass-bumping" electropop composition. It begins as a "gentle", piano-driven pop ballad, before launching into a hip hop and EDM breakdown with a "low-riding bassline" and a "buzzed beat". Kesha stated that "Tonight" is a "celebratory" song about "fucking up what I have". The song drew comparisons to many different works: its beginning and chorus to Lady Gaga (such as her 2016 album Joanne), while the breakdown to Kesha's pre-Rainbow music (notably, her Animal album).

== Live performances ==
Kesha performed "Tonight" during the Live with Kelly and Ryan after-Oscars show on February 10, 2020. During the performance, six backup dancers wearing colorful clothing were present, while the singer wore a jeweled teardrop accessory.

== Release history ==
Release dates and formats for "Tonight"
| Region | Date | Format(s) | Labels | Ref. |
|---|---|---|---|---|
| Various | January 28, 2020 | Digital download; streaming | Kemosabe; RCA | |
| Australia | January 31, 2020 | Radio airplay | RCA; Sony Music | |
