= Iozzi =

Iozzi is an Italian surname. Notable people with the surname include:

- Alessandra Iozzi (born 1959), Italian-American-Swiss mathematician
- Monica Iozzi (born 1981), Brazilian actress and reporter

== See also ==
- Rozzi
