= Resentment (disambiguation) =

Resentment is an emotion.

Resentment may also refer to:

- "Resentment" (Kesha song), a 2019 song by Kesha
- "Resentment" (Victoria Beckham song), a 2004 song by Victoria Beckham
