= High Road (Kesha album) =

2020 studio album by Kesha

Studio album by Kesha
- Released: January 31, 2020
- Recorded: 2017–2020
- Studios: MV Bliss Moored (Antibes, France); Purple Dinosaur; Scotch Corner (Sherman Oaks, California); United (Los Angeles); Venice Way (Los Angeles); Village (Los Angeles)
- Genres: Pop; electronic; country; rock
- Length: 48:35
- Labels: RCA; Kemosabe
- Producers: Kesha; Jeff Bhasker; Stuart Crichton; John Hill; Omega; Drew Pearson; Louis Schoorl; Stint

Kesha chronology
Rainbow (2017)	High Road (2020)	Gag Order (2023)

Singles from High Road
- 1. "Raising Hell" Released: October 24, 2019; 2. "My Own Dance" Released: November 21, 2019; 3. "Resentment" Released: December 12, 2019; 4. "Tonight" Released: January 28, 2020

High Road is the fourth studio album by American singer and songwriter Kesha. It was released on January 31, 2020, through RCA and Kemosabe Records. Announced in late 2019, the album saw the singer once again taking over the role of sole executive producer, following Rainbow (2017). She collaborated with various songwriters and record producers to achieve her desired sonority, combining elements of her career beginnings and Rainbow. Musically, High Road is primarily a pop, country and classic rock record, although it encompasses a variety of genres, including dance-pop, folk, electronic pop, synthpop, trip hop, electro-country, EDM, trap, dream pop, hip hop, and gospel.

Critical reception to High Road was mostly positive upon its release, although the singer's reapproach of her partying personality divided music critics. The album debuted at number seven on the US Billboard 200 albums chart, making it Kesha's fourth top-ten album in the country. It was supported by four singles: "Raising Hell" featuring Big Freedia, "My Own Dance", "Resentment", and "Tonight". Kesha was set to embark on the High Road Tour to promote the album, but the tour was ultimately cancelled due to the COVID-19 pandemic.

== Background and release ==
After the release of Rainbow, her third studio album, Kesha issued a new single titled "Rich, White, Straight Men" in June 2019. It was initially uploaded onto her YouTube account on June 2 without prior announcement and was made available in online music stores and streaming platforms six days later. In September 2019, Billboard published a cover story about the singer, in which she announced that her fourth studio album was in development and would be released in following December. Whilst discussing the lyrics of the album, Kesha commented that it would emphasize "the happiness that I began my career with", although "more earned and healthier than ever". In 2025, Kesha reveals that while she had wanted to portray freedom and joy with this album, the process was actually complicated as she had felt very lonely. Musically, it would define a "full return to Kesha's pop roots, after leaning into a more country–soul sound" in Rainbow. Kesha worked with some previous partners, such as Wrabel, Nate Ruess, Justin Tranter, and her mother Pebe Sebert, as well as new collaborators, including Tayla Parx, and Dan Reynolds of Imagine Dragons.

In October 2019, the album's artwork and track listing were unveiled. In December 2019, RCA Records announced that additional songs would be included in the track listing. The record's release date was postponed to January 10 and later to January 31, 2020. On the eve of the album's street date, Kesha revealed via Twitter that she had finalized a song titled "Summer" five days earlier. It was included as the closing track on digital versions of High Road.

The cover art for High Road depicts a melting candle made from a 3D scan of Kesha's head, which Dezeen described as "psychedelic". The image for the album were created by Brian Roettinger, a graphic designer who has worked with Jay Z, Childish Gambino and Florence and the Machine. Roetting explained that the melting candle represented that "nothing is permanent" as well as harkening to Kesha's exploration of themes of "joy" found in her earlier work. Kesha also sold the replicas of candle as merchandise for the album. Roettinger also served as the art director for the album and corresponding tour. Roettinger also used the motif of melting wax for Kesha's performance at the American Music Awards.

== Composition ==
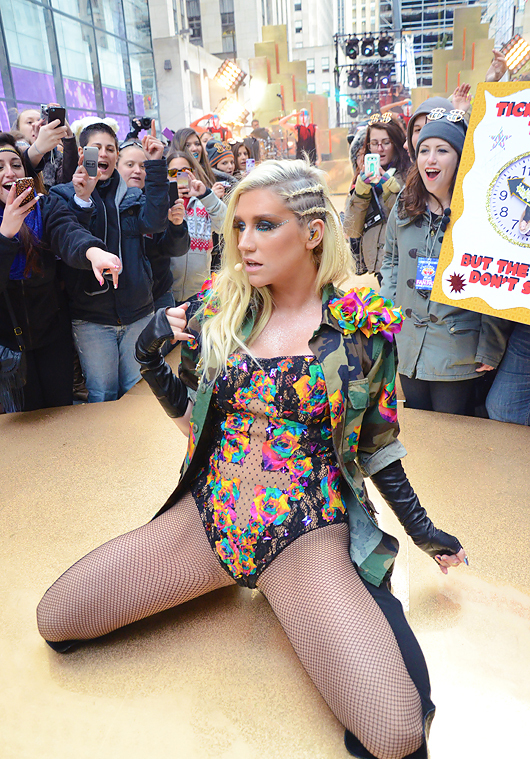
Kesha (pictured in 2012) decided to reconnect with the personality that was approached in her career beginnings, mixing it with the softer characterization of the Rainbow era.

=== Music and lyrics ===
Musically, High Road has been described as a "full-blown" pop, electro-country, and classic rock record, utilizing musical and vocal characteristics of other music genres, such as hip hop, and electronic music. Lyrically, the album addresses themes of romantic relationships, friendships, self-empowerment, family, and escapism. In the early stages of the album, Kesha's brother suggested that she make uptempo songs as in the past, but she rejected the idea because she didn't want to meet the audience's expectations. After the release of Rainbow, whose main motto was the trauma that Kesha experienced and was experiencing at the time, she decided to get closer to a "party girl" personality, who was present and helped to build the singer's public identity during the beginning of her career, especially in the Animal era. Along with the singer's visuals, Rainbow's lyrical and musical elements were unusual in relation to her previous works due to its more optimistic and sentimental approach. On High Road, she chose to blend the different approaches in an attempt to make them coexist in her personality. Laura Snapes of The Guardian affirms that High Road builds a new figure for Kesha's music "in the way that Tina Turner and Rihanna did after rejecting their own victim narratives", referring to the legal battle against Dr. Luke.

=== Songs and lyrical content ===
The album's standard edition contains 15 tracks. It opens with "Tonight", a "bass-bumping" electropop composition. It begins as an "emotive" piano-driven ballad followed by a hip hop- and EDM-influenced breakdown with a "low-riding bassline" and a "buzzed beat" that sees the singer rapping. Kesha stated that "Tonight" is a "celebratory" song about "fucking up what I have". The following track, "My Own Dance", sees the singer addressing the expectations placed upon her and her music. It has been described as a "bold statement about not being the thing people expect, or demand, you to be" which "finds her speaking her mind and making it clear that she's not going to dance for you because she's here to dance for herself". Both "Tonight" and "My Own Dance" were compared to Kesha's debut single "Tik Tok".

The "dance-floor inferno" lead single "Raising Hell" features guest vocals by Big Freedia and is a blend of multiple genres including gospel, EDM, country, and bounce. Compared to the single "Timber", which Kesha was featured on, it features beat drops accompanied by "soaring synth beats", gospel choirs, handclaps, a church organ, horns, and a post-chorus by Freedia. In the title track, Kesha makes fun of people "who think she's too much of an airhead to write hits or even spell her own name". "Shadow" is a piano ballad that "demonstrates Kesha's ability to cohesively present all facets of her talent" and questions her right to be happy. The song was compared to Kesha's 2017 song "Praying" and purposefully recalls "Spaceship" in the lyrics "I love tripping in the desert with my best friends, seeing spaceships in the sky". The soul-influenced sixth track, "Honey", is built upon a guitar riff and lyrically debates a "man-stealing ex-friend" with "humour and a chummy chatty style that moves into a more natural narrative". "Cowboy Blues" lyrically analyzes "the ways in which loneliness can cloud one's instincts" and was compared to Lady Gaga's 2016 album Joanne and Taylor Swift's works. The acoustic country ballad "Resentment" depicts a "relationship cracked apart by festering anger", with lyrics such as "I don't hate you, babe, it's worse than that / Cuz you hurt me, and I don't react." It features guest appearances by Brian Wilson, Sturgill Simpson, and Wrabel.

Nick Lowe of Clash labeled "Birthday Suit" as "the most brilliant thing [Kesha's] ever done". It is a "retro pop" song that samples musical elements from the Mario franchise and was compared to the works of Janet Jackson and Madonna. "Kinky" is a "suitably weird, wonderful and horny" electro–R&B song with elements of 1980s music and a "raunchy bassline". It has a featuring credit for Ke$ha, the stylization the singer used prior to Rainbow, and was compared to the works of Carly Rae Jepsen and the Spice Girls. Lyrically, the song sees the singer "celebrating kinks". Kesha sings about "preserving childlike innocence" in the "almost unbelievably bizarre" "Potato Song (Cuz I Want To)", which predominantly features oom-pah and saxophone. The singer said that the song is "about all the things that I want to do that, as an adult, are maybe kind of childish". Its polka influences were compared to Lily Allen's 2009 song "Never Gonna Happen". Thomas Green of The Arts Desk labeled it the album's best song.

The dream pop number "BFF" also features Wrabel, who is Kesha's long-time friend, and lyrically depicts their friendship. Kesha discourses about her absent father in "Father Daughter Dance". High Road ends with "Chasing Thunder", an "ode to wandering, and 'never growing up'" which was sonically compared to the work of Florence and the Machine. It has been described as a "distillation of the earnest, gravelly voice that made Kesha a star". The digital exclusive track "Summer" was compared to "Timber" and described as a "rather thought provoking, enjoyable pop track".

== Promotion and singles ==
In October 2019, to update her public on new releases, Kesha launched a hotline which featured a snippet of an upcoming song. Later that month the singer released a trailer to announce High Road's release. "Raising Hell" was released as the album's lead single on October 24, 2019, alongside its music video, which was directed by Luke Gilford. In the United States, it peaked at number five on the Billboard Dance Club Songs chart and at number 17 on the Bubbling Under Hot 100 chart. Kesha and Freedia performed the song for the first time on Jimmy Kimmel Live! on October 28. On November 21, 2019, "My Own Dance" was issued as the follow-up single. A music video directed by Allie Avital premiered the same day. The song was sent to Australian contemporary hit radio stations in the following day. On November 24, 2019, at the 47th ceremony of the American Music Awards, Kesha performed "Raising Hell" and "Tik Tok". "Resentment" was sent to Australian contemporary hit radio stations as the album's third single on December 13, 2019, followed by "Tonight" as the fourth on January 31, 2020. A music video for "Resentment" was shot with Kesha's personal iPhone and released on December 12. Kesha and Freedia performed "Raising Hell" on The Late Show With Stephen Colbert on January 10. Acoustic versions of "Raising Hell" and "Resentment" were released on January 29. The following day, she performed "Resentment" alongside Wrabel on The Late Late Show with James Corden. On February 3, a music video for the album's title track was released. On February 10, Kesha performed "Tonight" during the Live with Kelly and Ryan after-Oscars show. On April 17, she performed "Resentment" during the Tonight Show Starring Jimmy Fallon via a live streaming from her house. On April 26, 2020, she appeared in GLAAD's event Together in Pride: You Are Not Alone, which will raise funds for LGBT-related organizations associated with CenterLink. On August 4, 2020, a video for "Little Bit of Love", directed by Kesha and Jonah Best premiered on MTV Live and MTVU as well as on Kesha's Vevo channel. An acoustic performance "Kinky" was uploaded to Kesha's official YouTube account on October 24, 2020.

=== Touring ===
Promotional poster of the High Road Tour

In January 2020, Kesha announced the High Road Tour, with Freedia joining her as an opening act. The first concert was scheduled to take place on April 23 in Sugar Land, Texas. The tour was initially postponed to late 2020 due to the COVID-19 pandemic on March 31, but then it was officially cancelled on May 1.

==== Cancelled dates ====
List of concerts, showing date, city, country, venue, and reason for cancellation.
Date	City	Country	Venue	Reason
North America
April 23, 2020	Sugar Land	United States	Smart Financial Centre	COVID-19 pandemic
April 25, 2020	Irving	United States	The Pavilion at Toyota Music Factory	COVID-19 pandemic
April 26, 2020	Austin	United States	Moody Theater	COVID-19 pandemic
April 29, 2020	Phoenix	United States	Arizona Federal Theatre	COVID-19 pandemic
May 1, 2020	Las Vegas	United States	Pearl Concert Theatre	COVID-19 pandemic
May 2, 2020	San Diego	United States	CalCoast Credit Union Open Air Theatre	COVID-19 pandemic
May 5, 2020	Los Angeles	United States	Greek Theatre	COVID-19 pandemic
May 6, 2020	Santa Barbara	United States	Santa Barbara Bowl	COVID-19 pandemic
May 8, 2020	San Francisco	United States	SF Masonic Auditorium	COVID-19 pandemic
May 9, 2020	San Jose	United States	San Jose Civic	COVID-19 pandemic
May 11, 2020	Denver	United States	Mission Ballroom	COVID-19 pandemic
May 13, 2020	Council Bluffs	United States	Harrah's Council Bluffs	COVID-19 pandemic
May 14, 2020	Kansas City	United States	Starlight Theatre	COVID-19 pandemic
May 16, 2020	Nashville	United States	Ascend Amphitheater	COVID-19 pandemic
May 17, 2020	Alpharetta	United States	Ameris Bank Amphitheatre	COVID-19 pandemic
May 19, 2020	Cincinnati	United States	PNC Pavilion	COVID-19 pandemic
May 20, 2020	Minneapolis	United States	Minneapolis Armory	COVID-19 pandemic
May 22, 2020	Milwaukee	United States	Eagles Ballroom	COVID-19 pandemic
May 23, 2020	Chicago	United States	Huntington Bank Pavilion	COVID-19 pandemic
May 25, 2020	Maryland Heights	United States	St. Louis Music Park	COVID-19 pandemic
May 27, 2020	Philadelphia	United States	The Met Philadelphia	COVID-19 pandemic
May 28, 2020	New York City	United States	The Rooftop at Pier 17	COVID-19 pandemic
May 30, 2020	Mashantucket	United States	MGM Grand Theater	COVID-19 pandemic
May 31, 2020	Boston	United States	Leader Bank Pavilion	COVID-19 pandemic
June 2, 2020	Washington, D.C.	United States	The Anthem	COVID-19 pandemic
June 4, 2020	Niagara Falls	Canada	Fallsview Casino	COVID-19 pandemic
June 5, 2020	Windsor	Canada	Caesars Windsor	COVID-19 pandemic
June 7, 2020	New York City	United States	The Rooftop at Pier 17	COVID-19 pandemic
June 27, 2020^{[A]}	Edmonton	Canada	Kinsman Park	COVID-19 pandemic
Europe
July 1, 2020	Manchester	England	Manchester Academy	COVID-19 pandemic
July 2, 2020	Birmingham	England	O² Academy	COVID-19 pandemic
July 4, 2020	London	England	BST Hyde Park	COVID-19 pandemic

^{A} The June 27, 2020 show is part of the Soundtrack Music Festival.

== Commercial performance ==
On February 9, 2020, High Road debuted at number seven on the US Billboard 200 albums chart with 45,000 album-equivalent units consumed, of which 35,000 were pure album sales, making it Kesha's fourth US top-ten album.

== Critical reception ==
Professional ratings
Aggregate scores
Source	Rating
AnyDecentMusic?	7.0/10
Metacritic	73/100
Review scores
Source	Rating
AllMusic	3.5/5 stars
The A.V. Club	B+
Clash	8/10
DIY	4/5 stars
The Guardian	3/5 stars
The Independent	4/5 stars
The Irish Times	4/5 stars
Pitchfork	5.9/10
Rolling Stone	4/5 stars
Slant Magazine	3.5/5 stars

High Road received positive reviews from contemporary music critics. The union of the personas approached by Kesha throughout her career, which occurs musically and lyrically on the album, received polarizing responses, with some critics praising the artist's uniqueness, while others pointed out a false personality construction. At Metacritic, which assigns a normalized rating out of 100 to reviews from mainstream critics, the album has an average score of 73 based on 19 reviews, indicating "generally favorable reviews". Aggregator AnyDecentMusic? gave it 7.0 out of 10, based on their assessment of the critical consensus.

Adam White of The Independent praised the singer's maturity and confidence. The A.V. Club's Annie Zaleski praised the album for its musical diversity and lyrical and emotional depth. Sal Cinquemani of Slant also praised the album's sentimental approach, despite labeling it as Kesha's "least consistent" album due to the variety of music genres. Nick Lowe of Clash complimented it for not sounding forced despite its versatility, writing that Kesha "searches deep and emancipates the embodiment of sheer delight". Writing for DIY, Elly Watson defined the album as an "overwhelmingly triumphant pop offering that sees Kesha back at her best and having shit tons of fun while doing it". The Guardian's Aimee Cliff recognized the album as derived from the singer's early works with a "new sense of underlying self-awareness". Focusing on the same topic, Rob Sheffield of Rolling Stone praised Kesha's return to her party persona. Stephen Thomas Erlewine of AllMusic and Louise Bruton of The Irish Times particularly praised "My Own Dance" and Kesha's lyrical duplicity.

In a more mixed evaluation, Megan Buerger of Pitchfork summarized High Road as a setback following Rainbow, affirming that it "feels strained, scattershot, and loaded with tension, like someone trying to portray freedom and free-spiritedness—even a recovered sense of identity—who isn't quite there yet". She also criticized the album's premise, commenting that "it doesn’t feel like moving on, it feels like running away". Similarly, PopMatters' Nick Malone discredited Kesha's attempts to unite the diverse sounds with which she has worked throughout her career and even devalued the investment to return to Kesha's partying identity. He compared Kesha's concern with her audience's perception of herself to Miley Cyrus's fifth studio album Miley Cyrus & Her Dead Petz.

In June 2020, the album was included on Rolling Stone and American Songwriter's list of the best albums of 2020 so far.

== Track listing ==
All tracks are written by Kesha Sebert, with additional contributors noted.

High Road standard version
No.	Title	Writer(s)	Producer(s)	Length
1.	"Tonight"	Stephen Wrabel; Ajay Bhattacharya	Stint	3:15
2.	"My Own Dance"	John Hill; Justin Tranter; Daniel Reynolds	Kesha; Hill; Rob Cohen^{[a]}^{[b]}; Blake Mares^{[b]}	2:41
3.	"Raising Hell" (featuring Big Freedia)	Wrabel; Bhattacharya; Sean Douglas	Stint; Omega; Tainy^{[a]}; Daramola^{[a]}	2:49
4.	"High Road"	Jeff Bhasker; Nate Ruess; Wrabel	Bhasker; Skylar Mones^{[a]}	3:19
5.	"Shadow"	Andrew Pearson; Pebe Sebert	Pearson	3:33
6.	"Honey"	Stuart Crichton; Chelcee Grimes; Tayla Parx	Crichton	3:21
7.	"Cowboy Blues"	Wrabel; Eric Leva; Pearson	Pearson	4:00
8.	"Resentment" (featuring Brian Wilson, Sturgill Simpson, and Wrabel)	Wrabel; Madi Diaz; Jamie Floyd	Hill; Cohen^{[b]}; Mares^{[b]}	2:52
9.	"Little Bit of Love"	Wrabel; Ruess; Bhattacharyya	Stint	2:22
10.	"Birthday Suit"	Crichton; Grimes	Crichton	2:56
11.	"Kinky" (featuring Ke$ha)	Bhattacharyya; Wrabel; Douglas	Stint	3:25
12.	"Potato Song (Cuz I Want To)"	Crichton; P. Sebert	Crichton	3:33
13.	"BFF" (featuring Wrabel)	Crichton; P. Sebert; Wrabel	Crichton	4:11
14.	"Father Daughter Dance"	Pearson	Pearson	2:37
15.	"Chasing Thunder"	Bhasker; Wrabel; Louis Schoorl	Bhasker; Schoorl	3:41
Total length:				48:35

Digital bonus track
No.	Title	Writer(s)	Producer(s)	Length
16.	"Summer"	Ryan Lewis; Bill Danoff; Parks	Lewis	3:30
Total length:				52:05

Japanese CD bonus track
No.	Title	Writer(s)	Producer(s)	Length
16.	"Big Bad Wolf"	Wrabel; Pearson	Pearson	3:37
Total length:				52:12

Notes

- ^{^[a]} signifies an additional producer
- ^{^[b]} signifies a vocal producer

== Credits and personnel ==
Credits adapted from the album's liner notes, and organized in alphabetical order by surname.

=== Vocals ===
- Kesha – lead vocals (all tracks), backing vocals (6, 12, 13, 15)
- Michael Allen – backing vocals (16)
- Jeff Bhasker – backing vocals (4)
- Ajay Bhattacharya – backing vocals (1)
- Tanisha Brooks – backing vocals (16)
- Hayley Chilton – backing vocals (12)
- Stuart Crichton – backing vocals (6, 12)
- Chelcee Grimes – backing vocals (6)
- Chelsea Gillis – backing vocals (1)
- Josie Howell – backing vocals (16)
- Matt Jardine – backing vocals (8)
- Eric Leva – backing vocals (7)
- James Newman – backing vocals (6)
- Tayla Parx – backing vocals (6, 16)
- Nate Ruess – backing vocals (9)
- Louis Schoorl – backing vocals (15)
- Pebe Sebert – backing vocals (12)
- Sturgill Simpson – featured vocals (8)
- Graynor Strand – backing vocals (12)
- Maelu Strange – backing vocals (16)
- Leeza Tierney – backing vocals (12)
- Brian Wilson – featured vocals (8)
- Stephen Wrabel – backing vocals (1, 4, 5, 7–9, 11, 15, 16), featured vocals (8, 13)

=== Instrumentation ===
- Brianna Atwell – viola (16)
- Samantha Boshnack – trumpet (16)
- Jeff Bhasker – keyboards (4)
- Ajay Bhattacharyya – bass (1, 3, 9, 11), drums (1, 3, 9, 11), guitar (1, 3, 11), piano (1, 3), synthesizer (1, 11), horn (9), keyboards (9, 11)
- Rebecca Chung Filice – cello (16)
- Jason Cressey – trombone (16)
- Stuart Crichton – bass (10, 12, 13), keyboards (10, 12, 13), guitar (12)
- Madi Diaz – guitar (8)
- Wojtek Goral – alto saxophone (12)
- Chelcee Grimes – guitar (6)
- John Hill – drums (2), guitar (2), keyboards (2)
- Magnus Johansson – fluegelhorn (12), trumpet (12)
- Peter Noos Johansson – trombone (12), tuba (12)
- Tomas Johnsson – baritone saxophone (12)
- Greg Kramer – trombone (16)
- Eric Leva – ukulele (7)
- Seth May-Patterson – viola (16)
- Rachel Nesvig – violin (16)
- Ahameful Oluo – trumpet (16)
- Omega – drums (3), organ (3)
- Hunter Perrin – guitar (8)
- Josh Rawlings – piano (16)
- Maria Scherer Wilson – cello (16)
- Louis Schoorl – bass, drums, guitar, piano (15)
- Jesse Siebenberg – guitar (8)
- The Swedish Brass Mafia – brass (12)

=== Production ===
- Jeff Bhasker – production (4, 15)
- Rob Cohen – vocal production (2, 8)
- Stuart Crichton – production (6, 10, 12, 13)
- Daramola – additional production (3)
- John Hill – production (2, 8)
- Kesha – production (2)
- Ryan Lewis – production (16)
- Blake Mares – vocal production (2, 8)
- Skylar Mones – additional production (4)
- Omega – production (3)
- Drew Pearson – production (5, 7, 14)
- Louis Schoorl – production (15)
- Stint – production (1, 3, 9, 11)
- Tainy – additional production (3)
- Brian Wilson – vocal production (8)

=== Technical ===
- Jeff Bhasker – programming (4, 15)
- Ajay Bhattacharyya – programming (3)
- Dale Becker – mastering (1–16)
- Matias Byland – programming (12)
- Jon Castelli – mixing (1, 2, 4–9, 11–16)
- Rob Cohen – engineering (2, 8)
- Stuart Crichton – engineering and programming (6, 10, 12, 13)
- Josh Deguzman – engineering (1, 2, 4–9, 11–16)
- Scott Desmarais – assistant engineering (3, 10)
- Anthony Dolhai – engineering (1, 3, 9, 11)
- Matt Dyson – engineering (1–15)
- Isaiah Gage – string arrangement (5, 14)
- Chris Galland – engineering (3, 10)
- John Hill – programming (2)
- Stephen Hogan – engineering (16)
- Jeremie Inhaber – assistant engineering (3, 10)
- Andrew Joslyn – string arrangement (16)
- Blake Mares – engineering (2, 8)
- Manny Marroquin – mixing (3, 10)
- Johnny Morgan – assistant engineering (8)
- Drew Pearson – engineering (5, 7, 14)
- Nick Rowe – engineering and vocal engineering (8)
- Louis Schoorl – programming (15)
- Wesley Seidman – vocal engineering (8)
- Matt Tuggle – engineering (3, 5, 10, 11)
- Omega – programming (3)
- Hector Vega – assistant engineering (1–16)

=== Design ===
- Samantha Burkhart – styling
- Benjamin Lowy – photography
- Vittorio Masecchia – makeup artist, hair stylist
- Samantha Rhodes – assisting styling
- Brian Roettinger – creative direction, photography

== Charts ==
=== Weekly charts ===
Weekly chart performance for High Road
Chart (2020)	Peak position
Australian Albums (ARIA)	26
Belgian Albums (Ultratop Flanders)	163
Belgian Albums (Ultratop Wallonia)	178
Canadian Albums (Billboard)	20
Irish Albums (IRMA)	71
Japanese Albums (Oricon)	164
Scottish Albums (Official Charts)	27
Spanish Albums (Promusicae)	29
UK Albums (Official Charts)	63
US Billboard 200	7

=== Year-end charts ===
Year-end chart performance for High Road
Chart (2020)	Position
US Top Current Album Sales (Billboard)	92

== Release history ==
Release dates and formats for High Road
Region	Date	Format(s)	Version	Label(s)	Ref.
Various	January 31, 2020	CD; digital download; streaming	Standard	RCA; Kemosabe	
Various	January 31, 2020	Digital download; streaming	Digital edition	RCA; Kemosabe	
Japan	January 31, 2020	CD	Japanese edition	Sony Japan	
Various	February 25, 2022	Vinyl	Standard	Kemosabe	
