= Sideways (Wrabel EP) =

EP by Wrabel
- Released: 24 June 2014
- Genre: Pop
- Length: 13:40
- Label: Island Records
- Producer: Kat Kim

Sideways is an extended play (EP) by American singer and songwriter Wrabel, released on 24 June 2014 by Island Records.

== Ten Feet Tall ==
The song "Ten Feet Tall" was first released on 4 February 2014 as a single from Afrojack's album Forget the World. The version of "Ten Feet Tall" on the Sideways EP is the original piano-based version, done without Afrojack.

== Track listing ==
Sideways - EP
No.	Title	Writer(s)	Length
1.	"Ten Feet Tall"	Stephen Wrabel; Chris Braide	3:37
2.	"Sideways"	Wrabel; Jim Eliot; Dan McDougall	3:23
3.	"Give It Time"	Wrabel; Eliot; McDougall	3:10
4.	"Into The Wild"	Wrabel; Drew Pearson; Dan Black	3:29
Total length:			13:40

== Charts ==
Chart (2014)	Peak position
US Heatseekers Albums (Billboard)	10

== Release history ==
Region	Date	Format	Label
North America	24 June 2014	digital download	Island Records
