= Alessandra Iozzi =

Mathematician

Alessandra Iozzi (born 25 January 1959) is an Italian-born mathematician known for her research in geometric group theory. Originally from Rome, she holds Italian, Swiss, and American citizenships, and works as an adjunct professor of mathematics at ETH Zurich.

== Education and career ==
Iozzi obtained a laurea at the Sapienza University of Rome in 1982, supervised by Massimo Picardello. Then, she moved to the University of Chicago where she earned a master's degree in 1985 and a Ph.D. in 1989. Her dissertation, Invariant Geometric Structures: A Non-Linear Extension of the Borel Density Theorem, was supervised by Robert Zimmer.

After holding a lecturer position at the University of Pennsylvania for two years, she became a postdoctoral scholar first at the Mathematical Sciences Research Institute in Berkeley, CA and then at the Institute for Advanced Study in Princeton, NJ. From 1992 to 2000, she held a faculty position at the University of Maryland, College Park.

She first came to ETH Zurich as a visiting researcher in 2000–2001. After holding professorships at the University of Strasbourg in France and the University of Basel in Switzerland, she returned to ETH Zurich as a senior scientist in 2006 and took her present faculty position there in 2008.

== Recognition ==
Iozzi was named a Fellow of the American Mathematical Society, in the 2022 class of fellows, "for contributions to geometric group theory and the geometry of discrete subgroups of Lie groups, in particular higher Teichmuller theory."
