= Resentment (Kesha song) =

Single by Kesha featuring Brian Wilson, Sturgill Simpson, and Wrabel

from the album High Road
- Released: December 12, 2019
- Studio: The Village Recorder (Los Angeles, CA); United Recording (Las Vegas, NV)
- Genre: Country
- Length: 2:52
- Label: RCA; Kemosabe
- Songwriters: Kesha Sebert; Stephen Wrabel; Jamie Floyd; Madi Diaz
- Producers: John Hill; Rob Cohen; Blake Mares

Kesha singles chronology
"My Own Dance" (2019)	"Resentment" (2019)	"Tonight" (2020)

Brian Wilson singles chronology
"On the Island" (2015)	"Resentment" (2019)

Sturgill Simpson singles chronology
"Sing Along" (2019)	"Resentment" (2019)

Wrabel singles chronology
"(It Wouldn't Be) Christmas Without You" (2019)	"Resentment" (2019)	"Mean It" (2020)

Music video
- "Resentment" on YouTube

"Resentment" is a song by American singer Kesha featuring Brian Wilson, Sturgill Simpson, and Wrabel. It was released as the third single from her fourth studio album, High Road, on December 12, 2019, in Australia only.

== Background and promotion ==
On December 12, Kesha posted about the upcoming release of a new song titled "Resentment". In the post, she stated that she's "been dying to share this incredibly special song". Later that day, she briefly described the making of the song. She described Brian Wilson as "one of my personal musical heroes", said that she had "all the respect in the world" for Sturgill Simpson and described Wrabel as an "insanely talented songwriter".

== Composition and lyrics ==
"Resentment" was written by Kesha, Wrabel (who is also featured on the track) Jamie Floyd, and Madi Diaz, while its production was done by John Hill, who also co-produced the two previously released songs off of High Road. The song is an acoustic country ballad. The song's lyrics talk about a toxic relationship, with lyrics such as "I don't hate you, babe, it's worse than that / Cuz you hurt me, and I don't react." Kesha described the feeling of resentment as "such a powerful and destructive emotion and in my experience is more complex than hate or anger".

== Music video ==
The music video for "Resentment" premiered on the same day as the track. It was "self-shot by Kesha on her iPhone and paired with a VHS filter" and shows the singer "breaking down and confronting her inner demons in a hotel room, as the song plays over her".

== Live performances ==
Since the song's release, Kesha has performed the song various times, including a stripped down rendition for Vevo LiveXLive and various television shows including The Tonight Show Starring Jimmy Fallon and The Late Late Show with James Corden.

== Release history ==
"Resentment" release history
Region	Date	Format(s)	Labels	Ref.
Various	December 12, 2019	Digital download; streaming	RCA; Kemosabe	
Australia	December 13, 2019	Radio airplay	RCA; Sony	
