= My Own Dance =

2019 single by Kesha

Single by Kesha

from the album High Road
- Released: November 21, 2019
- Studio: The Village Recorder (Los Angeles, CA)
- Genre: Pop
- Length: 2:41
- Label: RCA; Kemosabe
- Songwriters: Kesha Sebert; Dan Reynolds; John Hill; Justin Tranter
- Producers: Kesha; John Hill; Rob Cohen; Blake Mares

Kesha singles chronology
"Raising Hell" (2019)	"My Own Dance" (2019)	"Resentment" (2019)

Music video
- "My Own Dance" on YouTube

"My Own Dance" is a song by American singer Kesha. It was released as the second single from her fourth studio album, High Road, on November 21, 2019.

== Background and promotion ==
In an interview with Rolling Stone, Kesha stated that "My Own Dance" was one of the first songs she wrote after the release of her previous album, Rainbow, saying "I kind of felt like I didn't have the right to be happy and write happy songs, and then 'My Own Dance' was the first pop song I wrote. I was like, 'Fine. I'll go write a fucking pop song.' And then I was like, 'Wait, this is superfun. Why am I keeping myself from the greatest pleasure of my life?'". On October 21, 2019, Kesha released a trailer for her upcoming fourth studio album, High Road. In the background, multiple songs from the album played, one of them being an instrumental version of "My Own Dance". The trailer also revealed some shots from the yet-to-be-released music video. On November 20, Kesha posted three photos of herself to her social media, captioned with some lyrics from the song. That same day, she also revealed the song's title, the people she collaborated with on it, as well as some more shots from the music video. The next day, the track, along with its music video, premiered. This was also promoted by another social media post.

== Composition ==
"My Own Dance" was written by Kesha, lead singer of Imagine Dragons Dan Reynolds, Justin Tranter, and John Hill. It was produced by Kesha and Hill. The track has been described as a "bold statement about not being the thing people expect, or demand, you to be" which "finds her speaking her mind and making it clear that she's not going to dance for you because she's here to dance for herself" and where "Kesha flips her public image around, implicating everyone who wanted her to get back to her old sound while still, to some extent, getting back to her old sound". The singer herself also added that "My Own Dance" is the "mission statement from the forthcoming record."

== Music video ==
The music video for "My Own Dance" was directed by Allie Avital, and shows the singer "in a rundown motel searching for a box of "magic cereal" and encountering a colorful cast of misfits, like bodybuilders in ski masks, lingerie-clad women in gas masks and a pair of twins straight out of The Shining. The journey eventually leads the singer to the supermarket, where she finds the lone box of "magic cereal", meets her clerk doppelgänger" At the end of the music video, scenes of the singer "in a kiddie pool filled with cereal and milk" can be seen.

== Release history ==
Release dates and formats for "My Own Dance"
Region	Date	Format(s)	Labels	Ref.
Various	November 21, 2019	Digital download; streaming	RCA; Kemosabe	
Australia	November 22, 2019	Radio airplay	RCA; Sony	
