= Rob Cohen (music producer) =

American songwriter

- Origin: Denver, Colorado
- Genres: Pop, Rock
- Occupations: Vocal producer, audio engineer, mixer
- Instruments: Guitar, Keys, Bass
- Years active: 2012-present

Rob Cohen is an American vocal producer, record mixer, songwriter and record producer known for his work with artists including Portugal. The Man, Demi Lovato, Imagine Dragons, Dua Lipa, Cage the Elephant, Khalid, Charli XCX, Diplo, Young the Giant, Bishop Briggs, Wafia, and more. After growing up in Denver Colorado, Cohen moved to Los Angeles to pursue a career in music production. He began working as an assistant engineer at Westlake Recording Studios; his projects included Rihanna's number-one album Unapologetic. After 5-years at Westlake, Cohen began to work with John Hill as a full-time engineer and vocal producer.

== Awards ==
In 2020, Cohen won a Grammy Award for his work as a vocal producer and engineer on Cage the Elephant's album Social Cues, which won "Best Rock Album". In 2017, Cohen worked together with John Hill on Portugal. The Man's #1 Billboard single "Feel It Still" which also won a Grammy Award for "Best Pop Duo/Group Performance. He also received a Grammy Award nomination for engineering on Beyoncé album Beyoncé album in 2015.

== Discography ==
Artist	Year	Album/"Song"	Vocal-Producer	Engineer	Mixer
Overcoats	2020	The Fight	check	check	
Pink Sweat$	2020	"17"	check	check	
Banoffee	2020	"Look At Us Now Dad"	check	check	
Celeste	2020	"Stop This Flame"		check	
Carly Rae Jepsen	2019	Dedicated	check	check	
Khalid	2019	Free Spirit		check	
Cage The Elephant	2019	Social Cues	check	check	
Bishop Briggs	2019	Champion	check	check	
Fitz and the Tantrums	2019	"123456"	check	check	
Wrabel	2019	"Love To Love You", "The Real Thing"			check
Wrabel	2019	"Too Close"		check	
Yuna	2019	"Rogue"	check		
Wafia	2019	"Flowers & Superpowers"	check	check	
Kesha	2019	"Resentment", "My Own Dance"	check	check	
Young The Giant	2018	Mirror Master	check	check	
Young The Giant	2018	"Superposition"	check	check	
Sylvan Esso	2018	'"PARAD(w/m)E"		check	
Wet	2018	"Lately", "There's a Reason"	check	check	
Whethan, Dua Lipa	2018	"High"	check	VP, P	
MØ, Diplo	2018	"Sun In Our Eyes"		check	
Wafia	2018	"I'm Good"	check	check	
Alice Merton	2018	"Funny Business"	check	check	check
Bishop Briggs	2018	"Water", "Church of Stars"	check	check	
Clean Bandit ft. Julia Michaels	2017	"I Miss You"	check	check	
Electric Guest	2017	"Plural"		check	
Charli XCX ft. Uffie	2017	"Baby Girl"		check	
Portugal. The Man	2016	"Feel it Still", "Easy Tiger", "Live in the Moment", "Rich Friends", "Tidal Wave"	check	check	
Zara Larsson	2016	"Make That Money Girl"		check	
Demi Lovato	2016	"Tell Me You Love Me"		check	
Imagine Dragons	2016	"Rise Up", "Zero"	check	check	
Banks	2016	"Poltergeist"	check	check	
Chairlift	2016	"Ch-Ching", "Moth to the Flame"		check	
Beyonce	2014	"Heaven"		check	
Rihanna	2012	Unapologetic		Asst-E	
Pentatonix	2012	Pentatonix		check	
