= Rozzi =

Rozzi is an Italian surname. Notable people with the surname include:

- Antonio Rozzi (born 1994), Italian footballer
- Mark Rozzi (born 1971), American politician
- Ricardo Rozzi (born 1960), Chilean ecologist and philosopher

== See also ==
- Rozzi Crane (born 1991), American singer-songwriter
- Rozzi, players of the Teatro dei Rozzi, Siena, founded 1531
- Roslindale, a neighborhood of Boston, nicknamed Rozzi
