= Wrabel =

American musician (born 1989)

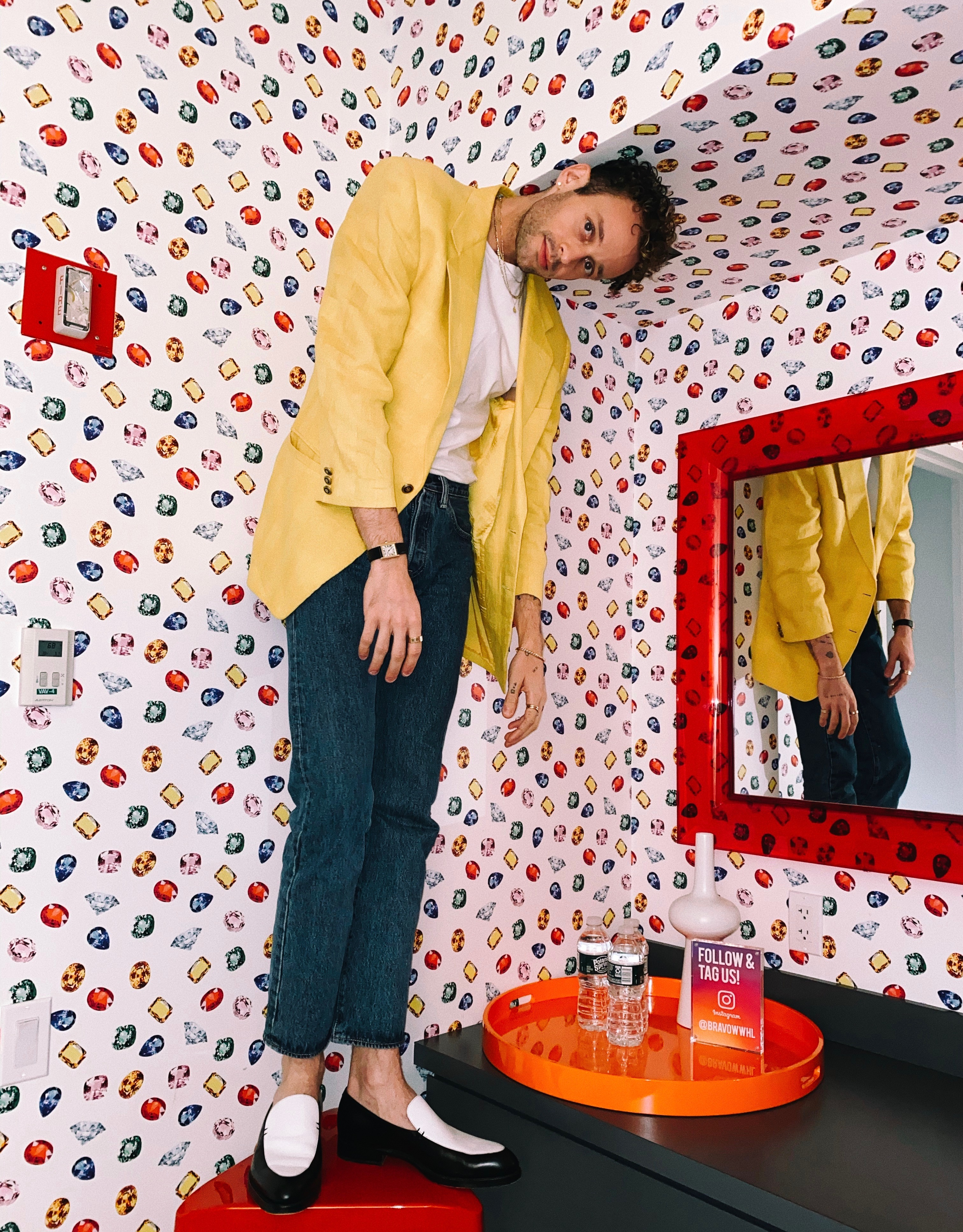
- Wrabel in 2019

Background information
- Born: Stephen Samuel Wrabel; January 7, 1989 (age 37); New York City, U.S.
- Genre: Pop
- Occupations: Musician; singer; songwriter; record producer
- Instruments: Vocals; piano; acoustic guitar
- Years active: 2012–present
- Labels: Big Gay; Epic; Island; Nettwerk
- Website: wrabelmusic.com

Stephen Samuel Wrabel (born January 7, 1989), known mononymously as Wrabel (/ˈreɪbəl/ RAY-bəl), is an American singer, songwriter, musician, and record producer based in Los Angeles.

== Life and career ==
Wrabel attended private high school at The Kinkaid School in Houston, Texas. After high school, he studied at the Berklee College of Music for a semester until he left Boston to move to LA and focus on songwriting. He got his first big break when he was signed to Pulse Recording as a songwriter.

In 2010, Wrabel recorded the theme song for the NBC game show Minute to Win It, "Get Up", produced by Eve Nelson.

Wrabel was signed to Island Def Jam in 2012 by Island Def Jam Music Group chairman and CEO Barry Weiss and Executive Vice President/Head of A&R Karen Kwak.

In 2014, Dutch DJ Afrojack released a version of Wrabel's song "Ten Feet Tall", resulting in an international hit. The song premiered in the United States during Super Bowl XLVIII in a Bud Light commercial and was viewed by around 100 million viewers. Wrabel later released the original piano-based version of the song on May 19, 2014. BuzzFeed named the Afrojack version of "Ten Feet Tall" one of the "35 Best Pop Songs You May Have Missed This Summer".

On June 24, 2016, Wrabel released his single "11 Blocks", which was heavily supported and promoted by Kesha. He also released both a lyric video and a music video for the song. He released his second single, titled "Bloodstain", on March 10, 2017. A lyric video for the song was released the same day. In May 2017, he released an EP titled We Could Be Beautiful.

In July 2017, he released a song titled "The Village", the song dedicated to show support for transgender people. The video shows a teenage trans boy living with his closed-minded family while the lyrics explain the difficulties in being transgender and a part of the LGBT community. The video ends with "#trans_rights_are_human_rights". The song was written in February 2017 after the removal of federal protections for trans students in public schools, and was quickly released after Donald Trump tweeted about banning transgender individuals from the military.

In 2025, Wrabel announced his third studio album Up and Above, scheduled for release on February 13, 2026. The album's title track and thematic direction were inspired by Annie Jacobsen's 2024 book Nuclear War: A Scenario, which Wrabel read while conceptualizing the project. The album explores themes of mortality and the fragility of human existence, with Wrabel describing the work as examining "if you knew the world was ending tomorrow, how much more would the person you love matter today?" The album's visual aesthetic, directed and photographed by Dana Trippe, features post-apocalyptic imagery including mushroom clouds and decaying landscapes, with Wrabel drawing inspiration from the works of René Magritte and confronting what he described as "the chilling silence that follows imagined devastation."

== Achievements ==
On the April 22, 2019, episode of The Ellen DeGeneres Show, Pink praised Wrabel and his video for "The Village", stating, "The song 'The Village' will break your heart into many little tiny pieces... he's great."

Billboard named Wrabel their Pride Artist of the Month in August 2019 saying "For the last decade, the 30-year-old singer-songwriter has been working with big names like Kesha and Adam Lambert while slowly building up his solo career. Now, he's ready for his breakthrough."

People magazine called Wrabel One to Watch in October 2019, saying "in 2019 he went from behind-the-scenes player to pop star."

In September 2019, The Huffington Post said Wrabel is "One of pop's unsung talents", adding "Recommendation from an artist of Pink's stature, on a huge platform like The Ellen DeGeneres Show, was an overdue acknowledgment of a prolific, if still overlooked, talent."

Wrabel was named to the OUT100 in 2017 and is a GLAAD Media Award Nominee for Outstanding Music Artist.

Nylon says Wrabel's debut EP Sideways is "stocked with the soulfulness of a Sia or Sam Smith, and a melodic pop DNA that throws back to icons like Paul Simon, the title track twists heartbreak into something, well, beautiful."

BuzzFeed named "I Want You" one of "The Most Criminally Underrated Pop Songs of 2015".

MNDR released a remix of Wrabel's "I Want You" on October 21, 2015, which premiered on Noisey.

His songwriting credits include releases by Pentatonix, Pink, Kesha, Louis The Child, Kygo, Marshmello, Backstreet Boys, and Ruel.

=== Usage of songs in other media ===
- In 2016, the song "Sideways" was featured in the first season finale of Quantico.
- In 2017, the song "We Could Be Beautiful" appeared in the 2017 reboot of Dynasty in the first season episode "Our Turn Now", during the wedding preparation scene. In 2020, this song also makes an appearance in the Hulu series Love, Victor, in the pilot episode "Welcome to Creekwood".
- In 2023, the song "On the Way Down" was featured in season 19 episode 8 of Grey's Anatomy.

== Personal life ==
Wrabel is openly gay. He is invested in promoting LGBTQ+ rights as a member of this community. His song "11 Blocks" is autobiographical describing his feelings about his first love who had moved 11 blocks away from him in California. The music video for his song "Bloodstain", directed by Isaac Rentz, depicts suffering and heartache in a relationship, while the star Wrabel is fighting for his life.

The music video to his 2017 song "The Village", directed by Dano Cerny, depicts a trans teenager struggling with gender dysphoria, using a binder to flatten his chest and dealing with hostile family members, with the lyrics discussing the same topics. The video includes a caption "In nature, a flock will attack any bird that is more colorful than the others because being different is seen as a threat" and ends with a caption "Dedicated to all the colorful birds" and the hashtag "#TransRightsAreHumanRights". In an interview about the song and video with Billboard, he described it as "the most important thing to me that I have ever done and probably will ever do. It's the closest thing to my heart." He wrote the song in February 2017, shortly after Donald Trump removed federal protections for trans students in public education, and asked his management to rush the release of the video after Trump announced a ban on trans military personnel, with the video including a visual reference to Trump's ban.

== Discography ==
=== Albums ===
==== Studio albums ====
List of studio albums
Title	Year
These Words Are All for You	Released: September 24, 2021; Label: Big Gay, Nettwerk; Formats: CD, digital download, streaming
Based on a True Story	Released: November 17, 2023; Label: Big Gay, Nettwerk; Formats: Digital download, streaming
Up Above	Released: February 13, 2026; Label: Big Gay, Nettwerk; Formats: Digital download, streaming

==== Live albums ====
List of live albums
Title	Details
One Nite Only (Live)	Released: January 25, 2019; Label: Big Gay; Formats: Digital download, streaming

=== Extended plays ===
List of extended plays, with selected chart positions
Title	Year	Peak chart positions
Title	Year	US Heat.
Sideways	Released: June 24, 2014; Label: Island; Formats: Digital download, streaming	10
We Could Be Beautiful	Released: May 12, 2017; Label: Epic; Formats: Digital download, streaming	—
One of Those Happy People	Released: September 13, 2019; Label: Big Gay; Formats: Digital download, streaming	—
Piano	Released: May 15, 2020; Label: Big Gay; Formats: Digital download, streaming	—
Chapter of Me	Released: April 21, 2023; Label: Big Gay; Formats: Digital download, streaming	—
Chapter of You	Released: August 25, 2023; Label: Big Gay; Formats: Digital download, streaming	—
"—" denotes a recording that did not chart or was not released in that territory.

=== Singles ===
==== As lead artist ====
List of singles as lead artist, with selected chart positions, showing year released and album name
Title	Year	Peak chart positions					Album
Title	Year	US Bub.	US AC	US Adult Pop	US Dance	CAN AC	Album
"11 Blocks"	2016	18	21	12	—	31	We Could Be Beautiful
"Bloodstain"	2017	—	—	—	—	—	We Could Be Beautiful
"It's You" (with Magical Thinker)	2017	—	—	—	—	—	Non-album singles
"The Village"	2017	—	—	—	—	—	Non-album singles
"First Winter"	2018	—	—	—	—	—	Non-album singles
"That's What I'd Do" (Live)	2019	—	—	—	—	—	One Nite Only
"I Want You" (Live)	2019	—	—	—	—	—	One Nite Only
"Woman" (Live)	2019	—	—	—	—	—	One Nite Only
"Oh Love" (with Parson James and Vincent)	2019	—	—	—	—	—	Non-album singles
"I Want You"	2019	—	—	—	—	—	Non-album singles
"Love to Love U"	2019	—	—	—	—	—	One of Those Happy People
"The Real Thing"	2019	—	—	—	—	—	One of Those Happy People
"Magic"	2019	—	—	—	—	—	One of Those Happy People
"Flickers"	2019	—	—	—	—	—	One of Those Happy People
"Flying"	2019	—	—	—	—	—	One of Those Happy People
"Happy People"	2019	—	—	—	—	—	One of Those Happy People
"Too Close" (with Louis the Child)	2019	—	—	—	40	—	Non-album singles
"(It Wouldn't Be) Christmas Without You"	2019	—	—	—	—	—	Non-album singles
"Somebody New"	2020	—	—	—	—	—	Non-album singles
"Hurts Like Hell"	2020	—	—	—	—	—	Non-album singles
"Since I Was Young" (with Kesha)	2020	—	—	—	—	—	Non-album singles
"Big Love" (with Klingande)	2020	—	—	—	—	—	Non-album singles
"Good"	2021	—	—	—	—	—	These Words Are All for You
"Nothing But the Love"	2021	—	—	33	—	—	These Words Are All for You
"Back to Back" (with Duncan Laurence)	2021	—	—	—	—	—	These Words Are All for You
"London"	2021	—	—	—	—	—	These Words Are All for You
"Worst Kind of Hurt" (with Laura Marano)	2022	—	—	—	—	—	Us
"Happier"	2023	—	—	—	—	—	Chapter of Me and Based on a True Story
"On the Way Down"	2023	—	—	—	—	—	Chapter of Me and Based on a True Story
"One Drink Away"	2023	—	—	—	—	—	Chapter of Me and Based on a True Story
"Turn Up the Love"	2023	—	—	—	—	—	Non-album single
"Abstract Art"	2023	—	—	—	—	—	Chapter of You and Based on a True Story
"We All Could Use Some Help"	2023	—	—	—	—	—	Chapter of You and Based on a True Story
"Beautiful Day"	2023	—	—	—	—	—	Based on a True Story
"Lost Cause"	2023	—	—	—	—	—	Based on a True Story
"At Least I Tried" (with Smith & Thell)	2024	—	—	—	—	—	A Chosen Family
"Buried Alive, Again" (with Renforshort)	2024	—	—	—	—	—	Non-album single
"Future"	2025	—	—	—	—	—	Up Above
"Up Above"	2025	—	—	—	—	—	Up Above
"Greener"	2025	—	—	—	—	—	Up Above
"Garden"	2025	—	—	—	—	—	Up Above
"Surrender"	2025	—	—	—	—	—	Up Above
"—" denotes a single that did not chart or was not released in that territory.

==== As featured artist ====
List of singles as featured artist, with selected chart positions, showing year released and album name
Title	Year	Peak chart positions					Album
Title	Year	US	US Pop	US Dance	CAN	CAN CHR	Album
"Ten Feet Tall" (Afrojack featuring Wrabel)	2014	100	22	9	—	43	Forget the World
"Ritual" (Marshmello featuring Wrabel)	2016	—	—	11	82	—	Non-album singles
"Another Side" (Matisse & Sadko and Robert Falcon featuring Wrabel)	2019	—	—	—	—	—	Non-album singles
"Resentment" (Kesha featuring Brian Wilson, Sturgill Simpson and Wrabel)	2019	—	—	—	—	—	High Road
"Mean It" (Cash Cash featuring Wrabel)	2019	—	—	—	—	—	Say It Like You Feel It
"Moon Rider" (Jai Wolf featuring Wrabel)	2020	—	—	—	—	—	Non-album single
"Mirror" (Illy featuring Wrabel)	2021	—	—	—	—	—	The Space Between
"Feel Again" (Armin van Buuren featuring Wrabel)	2022	—	—	—	—	—	Feel Again, Pt. 1
"Something I Could Never Be" (Tony Ann featuring Wrabel and Nour)	2024	—	—	—	—	—	Non-album single
"—" denotes a single that did not chart or was not released in that territory.

=== Guest appearances ===
List of non-single guest appearances, with other performing artists, showing year released and album name
Title	Year	Other artist(s)	Album
"Silent Night / Light of the World"	2012	—N/a	Dream Christmas
"We'll Be Okay"	2014	Afrojack	Forget the World
"You Know It's About You"	2015	Magical Thinker	Leap! (Original Motion Picture Soundtrack)
"With You"	2017	Kygo	Kids in Love
"Written in the Scars"	2017	Galantis	The Aviary
"90 Days"	2019	Pink	Hurts 2B Human
"BFF"	2020	Kesha	High Road
"Mirror"	2021	Illy	The Space Between
"When You Need It"	2022	Tenille Townes	Masquerades

=== Songwriting credits ===
Title	Year	Artist(s)	Album	Written with
"Shine"	2011	Stan Walker	Let the Music Play	Jon Asher, Drew Pearson
"Loud"	2011	Stan Walker	Let the Music Play	Jon Asher, Drew Pearson
"Nirvana"	2012	Adam Lambert	Trespassing	Oligee, Josh Abraham, Adam Lambert
"So Easy"	2012	Phillip Phillips	The World from the Side of the Moon	Pete Amato, Pete Salis
"Kiss Kiss"	2013	Prince Royce	Soy el Mismo	Fernando Garibay, Dougy Mandagi, Amanda Warner
"Crazy Ass B*tch"	2015	Rozzi Crane	Space	Crane, Kendrick Lamar, Adam Levine, Ali Tamposi, James Valentine
"Blue"	2015	Will Young	85% Proof	Jim Eliot, Dan McDougall
"Break"	2015	Katharine McPhee	Hysteria	McPhee, Pearson
"Rose Gold"	2015	Pentatonix	Pentatonix	Scott Hoying, Avi Kaplan, Pearson
"Devotion"	2015	Ellie Goulding	Delirium	Goulding, Ali Payami, Klas Åhlund
"In Our Bones"	2016	Against The Current	In Our Bones	Tommy English, Tamposi, Chrissy Costanza, Will Ferri, Dan Gow
"Cold"	2016	Citizen Four	Cold	Pearson, Makeba Riddick
"Everybody Knows"	2016	Idina Menzel	idina.	Greg Wells
"Tough"	2016	Goldroom	West of the West	Josh Legg, MoZella, Nico Stadi
"You Know It's About You"	2017	Magical Thinker	Leap! (Original Motion Picture Soundtrack)	Christopher Braide
"Crave"	2017	Dia Frampton	Bruises	Frampton, Stadi
"Hey You"	2017	Lea Michele	Places	Michele, Tamposi, Nick van de Wall
"Run to You"	2017	Lea Michele	Places	Michele, Tamposi
"Surround Me"	2017	Leon	Surround Me	Jon Mills, Kurtis McKenzie, Léon
"True Feeling"	2017	Galantis	The Aviary	Candy Shields, Bloodshy, Henrik Jonback, Jimmy Koitsch, Linus Eklow
"Written in the Scars"	2017	Galantis	The Aviary	Candy Shields, Bloodshy, Henrik Jonback, Jimmy Koitsch, Linus Eklow
"Woman"	2017	Kesha	Rainbow	Pearson, Kesha Sebert
"Emotional"	2017	Kesha	Rainbow	Pearson, Kesha Sebert
"With You"	2017	Kygo	Kids in Love	Pearson, Erik Hassle, Kygo
"Better Not"	2018	Louis The Child		Robby Hauldren, Frederic Kennett, Rogét Chahayed, Wafia
"Joshua Tree"	2018	Rozzi	Bad Together	Eric Leva, Rozzi Crane
"Bad Together"	2018	Rozzi	Bad Together	Eric Leva, Rozzi Crane
"Baby"	2018	Bishop Briggs		Sarah Grace McLaughlin, John Hill, Sean Douglas
"LY4L"	2018	Katelyn Tarver	Kool Aid	Tarver
"Water"	2018	Bishop Briggs	Church of Scars	John Hill, Sean Douglas, Briggs
"Don't Go Breaking My Heart"	2018	Backstreet Boys	DNA	Jamie Hartman, Stuart Crichton
"Healing Hands"	2018	Conrad Sewell	Ghosts & Heartaches	Sewell
"Still Good"	2018	DNCE	People to People	Eric Leva, Crichton & Robin Hannibal
"I'm Good"	2018	Wafia		Wafia
"Here Comes The Change"	2018	Kesha		Pearson, Kesha Sebert
"Rich, White, Straight Men"	2019	Kesha		Pebe Sebert, Kesha Sebert, Crichton
"Best Day"	2019	Kesha		Kesha Sebert, Scott Harris, Ryan Lewis, Joshua Robert Rawlings, Elan Wright, Phillip Peterson, Saba Samakar
"Raising Hell"	2019	Kesha	High Road	Kesha Sebert, Ajay Bhattacharya, Sean Douglas
"Flowers and Superpowers"	2019	Wafia		Wafia, Roget Chahayed, Hitboy
"Hard Sometimes"	2019	Ruel	Free Time	Mark Landon, Ruel Vincent Van Dijk
"call the police"	2019	the three of us		Madi Diaz, Jamie Floyd
"for months now"	2019	the three of us		Madi Diaz, Jamie Floyd
"Where We Started"	2019	Bailey Bryan	Perspective	Scott Harris, Rick Markowitz, Bailey Bryan
"Space"	2019	Yoshi Flower	Peer Pleasure	Joshua Smith, Danny Parra, Adam Comstock
"Strange"	2019	Celeste	Not Your Muse	Celeste Waite, Jaime Hartman
"All The Feels"	2019	Fitz and the Tantrums	All the Feels	Michael Fitzpatrick, Morgan Dorr, Jeremy Ruzumna, Noelle Scaggs, John Wicks, Joseph Karnes, James King
"Bad Habit"	2019	Ben Platt	Sing to Me Instead	Jesse Thomas, Ben Abraham, Ben Platt
"Chateau"	2019	Backstreet Boys	DNA	Stuart Crichton, Michael Pollack, James Newman, Cole Citrenbaum
"Don't Let It Break Your Heart"	2020	Louis Tomlinson	Walls	Louis Tomlinson, Stuart Crichton, Cole Citrenbaum, James Newman
"Dream on Me"	2020	Ella Henderson & Roger Sanchez		Gabriella Henderson, Jordan Riley, Roger Sanchez, Uzoechi Emenike
"Kid Again On Christmas"	2020	Tori Kelly	A Tori Kelly Christmas	Tori Kelly
"Side"	2021	Pentatonix	The Lucky Ones	Kevin Olusola, Madi Diaz, Matt Sallee, Mitch Grassi, Stuart Crichton
"20 Minutes"	2022	Years & Years	Night Call	Olly Alexander, Jesse Shatkin
"Muscle"	2022	Years & Years	Night Call	Olly Alexander, Joel Little
"Lost Cause"	2023	Pink	Trustfall	
