= Raising Hell (Kesha song) =

Single by Kesha featuring Big Freedia

from the album High Road
- Released: October 24, 2019
- Studio: The Village Recorder (Los Angeles, CA); Venice Way Studios (Venice, CA)
- Genre: Pop; pop rock; gospel; EDM; bounce
- Length: 2:49
- Label: Kemosabe; RCA
- Songwriters: Kesha Sebert; Stephen Wrabel; Sean Douglas; Ajay Bhattacharya
- Producers: Stint; Omega; Tainy; Daramola

Kesha singles chronology
"Safe" (2018)	"Raising Hell" (2019)	"My Own Dance" (2019)

Big Freedia singles chronology
"Bawdy" (2019)	"Raising Hell" (2019)	"Chasing Rainbows" (2020)

Music video
- "Raising Hell" on YouTube

"Raising Hell" is a song by American singer Kesha featuring American rapper Big Freedia. It was released as the lead single from Kesha's fourth studio album High Road on October 24, 2019.

== Background and promotion ==
On October 18, 2019, fans were prompted to call a hotline where the singer recorded a message to announce her return to music. On October 21, 2019, Rolling Stone posted a video clip with the announcement of Kesha's upcoming album High Road. Two days later, Kesha uploaded a trailer of the music video to her Instagram, revealing the release date to be October 24. The song was remixed for club and mix show radio play by Pink Panda, Justin Caruso, Steve James, The Wild, Dirty Werk, Robert Eibach and Danny Morris. It peaked at number 5 on the Billboard Dance Club Songs Chart on February 14, 2020.

== Composition ==
"Raising Hell" fuses pop, pop rock, gospel, EDM and bounce into a "Pink-esque" composition. It has been compared to the single "Timber", which Kesha was featured on. Described as combining the musical styles of Kesha's first two studio albums and her third, Rainbow, it features beat drops accompanied by "soaring synth beats", gospel choirs, handclaps, a church organ, horns, and a post-chorus by Freedia.

== Critical reception ==
“Raising Hell” was met with positive reviews from critics, with many deeming it a triumphant return for the pop star.

Gil Kaufman, writing for Billboard, called the song "an all-time keeper". Lars Gotrich of NPR wrote the song "sounds like dollar sign-era Ke$ha with some of the hard-won hindsight from 2017's optimistic, healing Rainbow". Jael Goldfine of Paper called the song "a wonderful midpoint between snarling party girl Kesha half-rapping over crunchy pop-EDM and her soulful balladry on Rainbow".

== Music video ==
The music video for "Raising Hell" was directed by Luke Gilford. The video portrays Kesha as a televangelist, loved by the people who she preaches to, but is married to an abusive husband. One night, Kesha tries to seduce her drunk husband but is almost choked to death until he is stabbed in the head. Kesha then drags the dead body to the trunk of her car, dyes her hair dark brown, and flees to a motel out of town. She is then wanted for murder and is chased by the police until she is eventually caught and arrested for killing her husband.

== Live performances ==
Kesha and Big Freedia performed the song for the first time on Jimmy Kimmel Live! on October 28, 2019.

The duo performed the song at the 2019 American Music Awards, followed by a performance of "Tik Tok". At one point, her performance became the most tweeted that night.

== Track listing ==
Digital download and streaming

1. "Raising Hell" (featuring Big Freedia)

Digital download and streaming (Justin Caruso remix)

1. "Raising Hell" (Justin Caruso remix; featuring Big Freedia)

Digital download and streaming (Pink Panda remix)

1. "Raising Hell" (Pink Panda remix; featuring Big Freedia)

Digital download and streaming (Steve James remix)

1. "Raising Hell" (Steve James remix)

Digital download and streaming (The Wild remix)

1. "Raising Hell" (The Wild remix)

== Charts ==
Chart (2019–2020)	Peak position
Canada CHR/Top 40 (Billboard)	25
Canada Hot AC (Billboard)	37
Canadian Hot Digital Song Sales (Billboard)	35
Ireland (IRMA)	97
New Zealand Hot Singles (RMNZ)	26
Scottish Singles Sales (Official Charts)	58
UK Singles Downloads (Official Charts)	64
US Bubbling Under Hot 100 (Billboard)	17
US Adult Pop Airplay (Billboard)	22
US Dance Club Songs (Billboard)	5
US Dance Airplay (Billboard)	8
US Digital Song Sales (Billboard)	19
US Pop Airplay (Billboard)	24
Venezuela (Record Report)	95

== Certifications ==
Region	Certification	Certified units/sales
United States (RIAA)	Gold	500,000^{‡}
^{‡} Sales+streaming figures based on certification alone.

== Release history ==
Region	Date	Format	Version	Label	Ref.
Various	October 24, 2019	Digital download; streaming	Original	Kemosabe; RCA	
Australia	October 25, 2019	Contemporary hit radio	Original	Kemosabe; RCA	
United States	October 29, 2019	Contemporary hit radio	Original	Kemosabe; RCA	
Various	January 24, 2020	Digital download; streaming	Justin Caruso remix	Kemosabe; RCA	
Various	February 7, 2020	Digital download; streaming	Pink Panda remix	Kemosabe; RCA	
Various	February 7, 2020	Digital download; streaming	Steve James remix	Kemosabe; RCA	
Various	February 7, 2020	Digital download; streaming	The Wild remix	Kemosabe; RCA	
