= I Am the Dance Commander + I Command You to Dance: The Remix Album =

2011 remix album by Kesha

Remix album by Kesha
- Released: March 18, 2011
- Length: 48:00
- Label: RCA

Kesha chronology
Cannibal (2010)	I Am the Dance Commander + I Command You to Dance: The Remix Album (2011)	Warrior (2012)

I Am the Dance Commander + I Command You to Dance: The Remix Album is the first remix album by American singer and songwriter Kesha, released on March 18, 2011. Announced on February 23, 2011, the album contains nine remixes, including featured appearances from André 3000 and 3OH!3, and one previously unreleased track, "Fuck Him He's a DJ". According to Kesha, the album is intended to be a play on her image; she is commonly perceived as a drunk party girl when in actuality her lifestyle is about having fun no matter the circumstances.

== Background and development ==
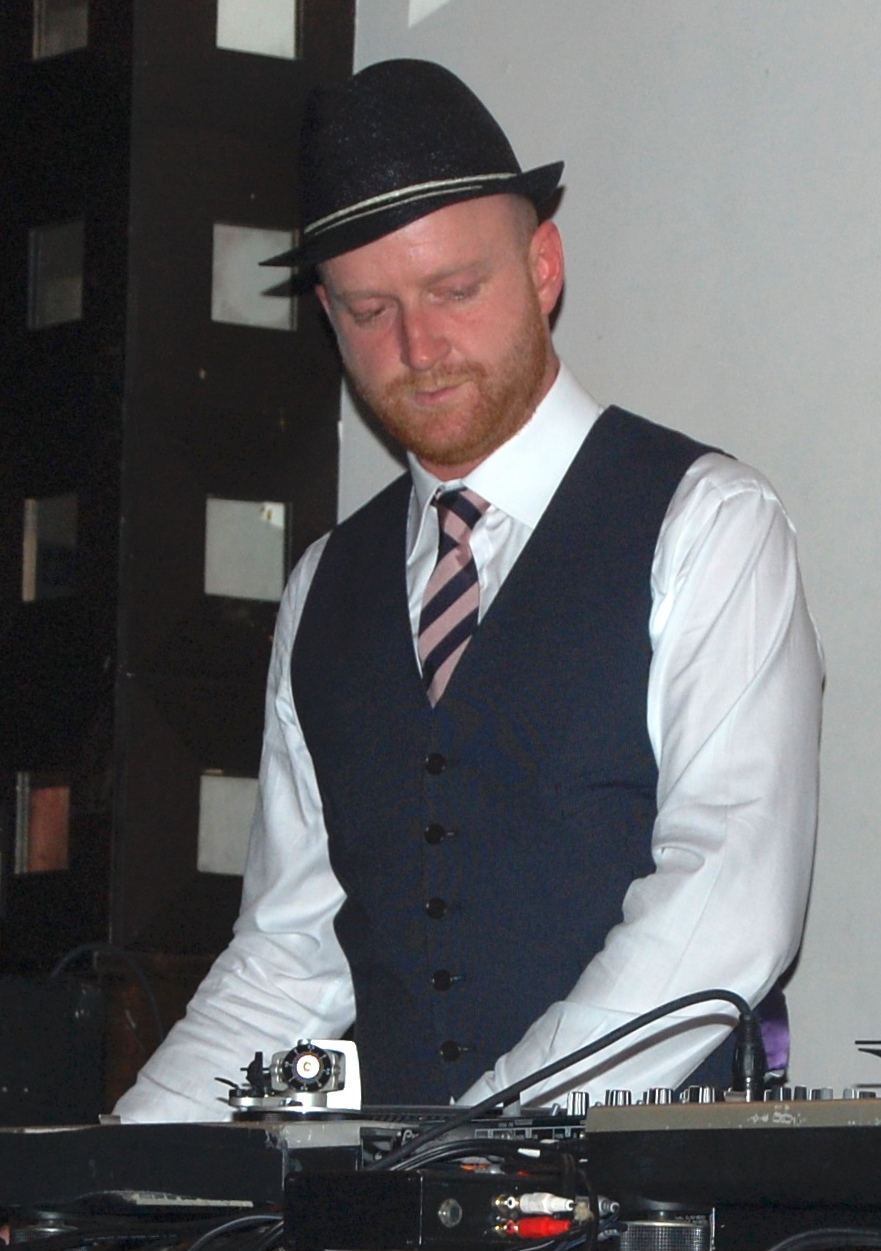
DJ Switch (pictured) was the producer responsible for the remix of "Animal".

I Am the Dance Commander + I Command You to Dance: The Remix Album is the first remix album by Kesha, released by RCA Records on March 18, 2011. The album's release was announced on February 23, 2011, along with the album's title, track listing, and cover. The album's track listing consists of remixed songs and new guest features from Kesha's first album, Animal, and her first extended play (EP), Cannibal. In January 2011, Kesha sent her track "Sleazy" to rapper André 3000, in hopes that he would collaborate with her; they later spoke on the phone and André agreed to appear on the track. The remix of "Animal" by DJ Switch was released online by Entertainment Weekly on February 24, 2011.

According to Kesha, the album's release is intended to be an attempt to spin her "party girl" image, which she explained, "People always think I’m a party girl and that sometimes has a negative connotation but really the party for me is not about being fucked up, [...] It’s about enjoying life and having fun no matter what the circumstances are. I consider myself not a party girl but a dance commander." The song "Fuck Him He's a DJ", is the album's only song not derived from her first studio album or extended play; the song was previously unavailable for purchase prior to the remix' release. Kesha explained the reason for its inclusion on the album stating, "I love DJs and I love that song, [...] When I do it in my live show I play guitar. It’s been a fan favorite for a long time but no one could buy it anywhere. I thought it was high time to make it available to my fans."

== Composition ==
"The Sleazy Remix" features rapper André 3000, who raps over the song's "bouncy thump" beat talking about a young child dealing with his deadbeat father, "We start out so cute in our baby pictures/ That mama shot for our daddy so that he wouldn't forget you/ He forgot anyway, but hey, one day he'll remember/ If not, he's human, I'm human, you human, we'll forgive him." André then transitions into a rap about his relationship with Kesha before she takes over the rest of the song. Switch's remix of "Animal" features "squealing electronic flourishes" similar to his contribution to British rapper M.I.A.'s "Steppin' Up", turning the originally upbeat track into an "eerie, echoey lament".

== Touring ==
On her first headlining tour, Get Sleazy Tour, Kesha played the song "Fuck Him He's a DJ". On her second headlining tour, Warrior Tour, she played a snippet of the Blow Cirkut Remix.

== Critical reception ==
David Jeffries from AllMusic was positive in his review of I Am the Dance Commander + I Command You to Dance: The Remix Album. Jeffries wrote that although the album was made up of previously heard tracks from her first two albums, this remix album was completely different. "Your Love Is My Drug" and "Blow" were highlighted in the review being called the "anchor[s] [to] this generally frenzied collection." Jeffries concluded his review talking about "Fuck Him He's a DJ" writing the track "finds its official home here, strutting and sinning defiantly, reassuring Kesha fans that the kids are all spite."

== Commercial performance ==
In the United States, I Am the Dance Commander + I Command You to Dance: The Remix Album entered the Billboard 200 at position thirty-six, selling 14,000 units in its first week of release. In the same week, the album was listed at position thirteen on the Digital Albums chart and at number one on Billboard's Dance/Electronic Albums chart. In Australia, on the issue date titled April 3, 2011, the album entered the charts at position forty-six. The Remix album sold 118,000 copies in US.

== Track listing ==
No.	Title	Writer(s)	Remixer(s)	Length
1.	"Blow" (Cirkut Remix)	Kesha Sebert, Lukasz Gottwald, Benjamin Levin, Klas Åhlund, Max Martin, Allan Grigg	Cirkut	4:05
2.	"The Sleazy Remix" (featuring André 3000)	K. Sebert, Gottwald, Levin, Shondrae Crawford, Åhlund, André Benjamin	Dr. Luke, Benny Blanco, Bangladesh	3:48
3.	"Tik Tok" (Untold Remix)	K. Sebert, Gottwald, Levin	Untold	5:00
4.	"Fuck Him He's a DJ"	K. Sebert, Tom Neville, Olivia Nervo, Miriam Nervo	Neville	3:44
5.	"Animal" (Switch Remix)	K. Sebert, Gottwald, Greg Kurstin, Pebe Sebert	Switch, Sticky K	4:26
6.	"Your Love Is My Drug" (Dave Audé Club Remix)	K. Sebert, P. Sebert, Joshua Coleman	Dave Audé	7:29
7.	"We R Who We R" (Fred Falke Club Remix)	K. Sebert, Gottwald, Levin, Coleman, Jacob Kasher Hindlin	Fred Falke	6:56
8.	"Take It Off" (Billboard Remix)	K. Sebert, Gottwald, Claude Kelly	Billboard	3:38
9.	"Tik Tok" (Chuck Buckett's Veruca Salt Remix)	K. Sebert, Gottwald, Levin	Chuck Buckett	4:53
10.	"Blah Blah Blah" (DJ Skeet Skeet Radio Remix) (featuring 3OH!3)	K. Sebert, Levin, Neon Hitch, Sean Foreman	DJ Skeet Skeet	4:02
Total length:				48:00

Notes

- Track list as per the I Am the Dance Commander + I Command You to Dance: The Remix Album audio CD liner notes.
- A clean/censored version of the album is available at Walmart; it omits the track "Fuck Him He's a DJ".
- Chinese CD releases also omits the "Blah Blah Blah" remix as per the censorship laws in China.

Animal + Cannibal: The Remix Album
No.	Title	Writer(s)	Remixer(s)	Length
1.	"Tik Tok" (Tom Neville Crunk + Med Remix)	K. Sebert, Gottwald, Levin	Neville	6:54
2.	"Tik Tok" (Fred Falke Club Remix)	K. Sebert, Gottwald, Levin	Falke	6:40
3.	"Your Love Is My Drug" (Dave Audé Club Remix)	K. Sebert, P. Sebert, Coleman	Audé	7:29
4.	"Your Love Is My Drug" (Bimbo Jones Radio Remix)	K. Sebert, P. Sebert, Coleman	Bimbo Jones	3:08
5.	"Blah Blah Blah" (DJ Skeet Skeet Radio Remix featuring 3OH!3)	K. Sebert, Levin, Hitch, Foreman	DJ Skeet Skeet	4:02
6.	"Animal" (Switch Remix)	K. Sebert, Gottwald, Kurstin, P. Sebert	Switch, Sticky K	4:26
7.	"Animal" (Billboard Remix)	K. Sebert, Gottwald, Kurstin, P. Sebert	Billboard	4:16
8.	"We R Who We R" (Fred Falke Club Remix)	K. Sebert, Gottwald, Levin, Coleman, Hindlin	Falke	6:57
9.	"We R Who We R" (Hagenaar + Albrecht Remix)	K. Sebert, Gottwald, Levin, Coleman, Hindlin	Hagenaar + Albrecht	7:17
10.	"Take It Off" (Corey Enemy Club Remix)	K. Sebert, Gottwald, Kelly	Corey Enemy	6:24
11.	"Take It Off" (Billboard Remix)	K. Sebert, Gottwald, Kelly	Billboard	3:38
12.	"The Sleazy Remix" (featuring André 3000)	K. Sebert, Gottwald, Levin, Crawford, Åhlund, Benjamin	Dr. Luke, Blanco, Bangladesh	3:50
13.	"Fuck Him He's a DJ"	K. Sebert, Neville, O. Nervo, M. Nervo	Neville	3:46

== Personnel ==
Credits adapted from the liner notes of I Am the Dance Commander + I Command You to Dance: The Remix Album, Dynamite Cop Music/Where Da Kasz at BMI.

- Benny Blanco – producer
- Billboard – remixing
- Anita Marisa Boproducer
- DJ Cirkut – remixing
- DJ Skeet Skeet – additional production, remixing
- Dr. Luke – executive producer, producer
- Dream Machine – remix producer
- Christian Dwiggins – mixing
- Dave Dwiggins – mixing
- Fred Falke – additional production, instrumentation
- Sarai Fiszelld – make-up
- Sean Foreman – composer
- Chris Gehringer – mastering
- Serban Ghenea – mixing
- Erwin Gorostiza – creative director
- Lukasz Gottwald – composer
- Allan Grigg – composer
- Rani Hancock – A&R
- John Hanes – mixing
- Jacob Kasher Hindlin – composer
- Neon Hitch – composer
- Claude Kelly – composer
- Kool Kojak – producer
- Greg Kurstin – composer, producer
- Benjamin Levin – composer
- Marjan Malakpour – stylist
- Max Martin – composer, producer
- Ramsell Martinez – hair stylist
- Miriam Nervo – composer, vocal producer, background vocals
- Olivia Nervo – composer, vocal producer, background vocals
- Tom Neville – arranger, composer, engineer, instrumentation, producer
- Tim Roberts – mixing assistant
- Kesha Sebert – composer
- Pebe Sebert – composer
- Skinny – creative consultant
- Sticky K – additional production, remixing
- Switch – additional production, remixing
- Untold – Additional production, remixing
- Emily Wright – engineer

== Charts ==
=== Weekly charts ===
Chart (2011)	Peak position
Australian Albums (ARIA)	46
Canadian Albums (Billboard)	37
South Korean Albums (Circle)	84
South Korean International Albums (Circle)	30
US Billboard 200	36
US Top Dance Albums (Billboard)	1

=== Year-end charts ===
Chart (2011)	Position
US Top Dance/Electronic Albums (Billboard)	11

== Release history ==
List of release dates, showing country, formats released, and record label
Country	Release date	Format(s)	Label
Australia	March 18, 2011	Digital download	Sony Music
Germany	March 18, 2011	Digital download	Sony Music
Ireland	March 18, 2011	Digital download	Sony Music
Sweden	March 18, 2011	CD, digital download	Sony Music
New Zealand	March 21, 2011	Digital download	Sony Music
Canada	March 22, 2011	CD, digital download	Sony Music
United States	March 22, 2011	CD, digital download	RCA, Kemosabe
South Korea	March 23, 2011	CD, digital download	Sony Music
