= Cannibal (EP) =

2010 EP by Kesha

EP by Kesha
- Released: November 19, 2010
- Recorded: 2010
- Studios: Conway Recording (Los Angeles); ACME Recording (Long Beach)
- Genre: Dance-pop
- Length: 31:58
- Label: RCA
- Producers: Billboard; Benny Blanco; Ammo; Max Martin; Bangladesh; Dr. Luke; Kool Kojak; David Gamson; Greg Kurstin

Kesha chronology
Animal (2010)	Cannibal (2010)	I Am the Dance Commander + I Command You to Dance: The Remix Album (2011)

Singles from Cannibal
- 1. "We R Who We R" Released: October 22, 2010; 2. "Blow" Released: February 1, 2011

Cannibal is the first extended play (EP) by the American singer and songwriter Kesha, released on November 19, 2010. The EP is a follow-up companion to her debut album, Animal (2010), and was sold and released as both an EP and a deluxe edition of Animal. Kesha worked with a variety of producers and writers such as executive producer Dr. Luke, Benny Blanco, Ammo, Max Martin, Bangladesh and others. Musically, the songs on Cannibal are of the dance-pop genre, with some songs incorporating elements of electro and electropop in their production and beats. Throughout the album, the use of Auto-Tune and vocoders is prominent. Lyrically, the songs on Cannibal speak of ignoring judgement or hate and experiences based on love and heartbreak.

Cannibal received generally positive reviews from music critics. However, a common complaint amongst critics was the overuse of Auto-Tune, while the album's production was generally highlighted. The album's lyrics polarized music critics; some praised her boldness, while others criticized them as being too raunchy. In the United States, the EP reached a peak of 15 on the Billboard 200 albums chart, selling 74,000 copies in its first week of release. In Canada, the album achieved similar success, reaching a peak of 14 on the Canadian Albums Chart. Cannibal was certified 2× Platinum by the Recording Industry Association of America (RIAA) for sales of two million copies in the United States.

Two singles were released from the album. The lead single, "We R Who We R", was a worldwide success, debuting at number 1 on the United States Billboard Hot 100, the United Kingdom Singles Chart and in Australia, and charting within the Top 10 in numerous other countries. The album's second single, "Blow", was released on February 1, 2011. The song charted highly in Australia, New Zealand and the United States. Kesha promoted the EP and her debut album by her first headlining concert tour, the Get Sleazy Tour, in 2011. In January 2020, the title track "Cannibal" enjoyed a resurgence in popularity due to its use on the social media site TikTok. The song went so far as to reach the Top 40 on the Canadian Hot 100.

== Background and development ==
"This year has been carnivorous and life-changing. I have my rowdy, gorgeous fans to thank for taking me on the ride of a lifetime,[...] My only goal with this record is to keep them dancing. The songs on Cannibal were made to inspire people to ignore any hate or judgment and be themselves unapologetically. It's the perfect companion to Animal and I hope you guys like it. And if you don't like it—bite me."

— Kesha explaining the title of the record and re-release

Originally intended to only be a re-release of her debut album Animal, Cannibal was instead released both as a deluxe edition of Animal as well as a standalone extended play (EP). The EP has been classified as a follow up "nine-song companion" record to Animal. Cannibal was originally intended to contain anywhere between four and eight tracks with the final outcome instead consisting of eight tracks, and a remix of her debut album's title track, for a total of nine tracks.

Partial recording of the album took place during September 2010, at Conway Studios with Dr. Luke again as the executive producer. Kesha recorded the abundance of Cannibal over a two-week span with a variety of producers Qu1k and more; the short recording period was due to her only being available for a limited amount of time due to prior commitments. During an interview with Billboard conducted by Chris Willman, one of the potential songs for the album was used as an example of how Luke and Kesha collaborated to create a song for this record: "There's an unfinished chorus on this new track, in which Gottwald is singing through such distorted Auto-Tune, it's impossible to tell what he's saying-which is deliberate, so he won't unduly influence Ke$ha when she comes up with her own lyrics."

Like her debut album, Kesha worked with some previous producers and writers that worked with her on her first album, such as: Dr. Luke, Ammo, Benny Blanco and Max Martin. Unlike her debut album though, Kesha enlisted the help of producer Bangladesh. She explained the reason for enlisting his help was that she wanted to "add a tougher edge to her music". She said that the message she wanted to put out through this album was to create "good, positive, [danceable] music". She elaborated, "I feel like I'm creating this hopefully very youthful and irreverent movement of the kids, of like adolescence. I feel like the parents don't get it, but the kids get it. And they deserve to have more good, positive music."

== Composition ==
"Cannibal"
"Cannibal" makes use of synth and dance driven backings while combining elements of yodeling.

"The Harold Song"
"The Harold Song" is a power ballad that features a more stripped down vocal style portraying Kesha's vulnerable side.

Musically, the songs on Cannibal are of the dance-pop genre, while some of its songs incorporate elements of electro and electropop in its production and beats. Throughout the album, the use of Auto-Tune and vocoders are prominent. The album's title track, "Cannibal", makes use of synth and dance driven backings while Kesha sings about maneater tendencies and makes a reference to serial killer, Jeffrey Dahmer. Present throughout the song are snippets of Kesha yodeling. "Blow" shows a darker side of Kesha with lyrics like: "We get what we want/ We do what you don't." The song is more dominantly an electro infused track that uses a synth beat backing. Vocally the song uses snippets of Kesha's yodeling, combined with heavy use of Auto-Tune. "Sleazy" changes pace from Kesha's normally persistent "talk-singing" vocal style, to a more rap-driven style. She raps over a thundering bass line and ticking beat backing, while the song speaks of wealthy men hitting on Kesha, trying to buy her attention. The song has been cited for drawing influence from multiple songs including; Gwen Stefani's "Hollaback Girl" for its "swagga", Jennifer Lopez's "Love Don't Cost a Thing" for its "attitude", as well as combining "a touch of Lil Wayne's "A Milli".

"C U Next Tuesday" is a dance-pop song that talks about "lost and unrequited love" "The Harold Song" has been cited as the album's power ballad that features a more stripped down vocal style portraying a vulnerable side of Kesha. "Grow a Pear" is an electropop song with lyrical content that has been compared to Katy Perry's, "Ur So Gay". The album's lead single, "We R Who We R", is a dance-pop song that uses a synth-heavy backing. The song incorporates elements of trance pop and electropop it both its production, and beats. Lyrically, the song has been described as a Pride anthem, with Kesha noting the song's lyrics were to be taken as "a celebration of any sort of quirks or eccentricities."

== Promotion ==
To promote the album, Kesha made several performances worldwide. Her first televised appearance was in Australia, where she performed "We R Who We R" for the time on season 2 of the Australian X Factor on November 14, 2010. Following the performance, Kesha performed the song at the American Music Awards on November 21, 2010, in the United States. Kesha opened the performance with "Take It Off" before transitioning into "We R Who We R". "Blow" and "Animal" were performed live on May 22, 2011, at the Billboard Music Awards; the performance opened with "Animal" as Kesha sang suspended over the stage in a structure shaped like a diamond. Midway through the performance she dropped backwards into her crowd of background dancers then transitioned into "Blow". The performance featured glitter cannons and the dancers wore orange unicorn heads. The album received further promotion from her first headlining world concert tour, entitled the Get Sleazy Tour, which began on February 15, 2011, in Portland, Oregon.

== Singles ==
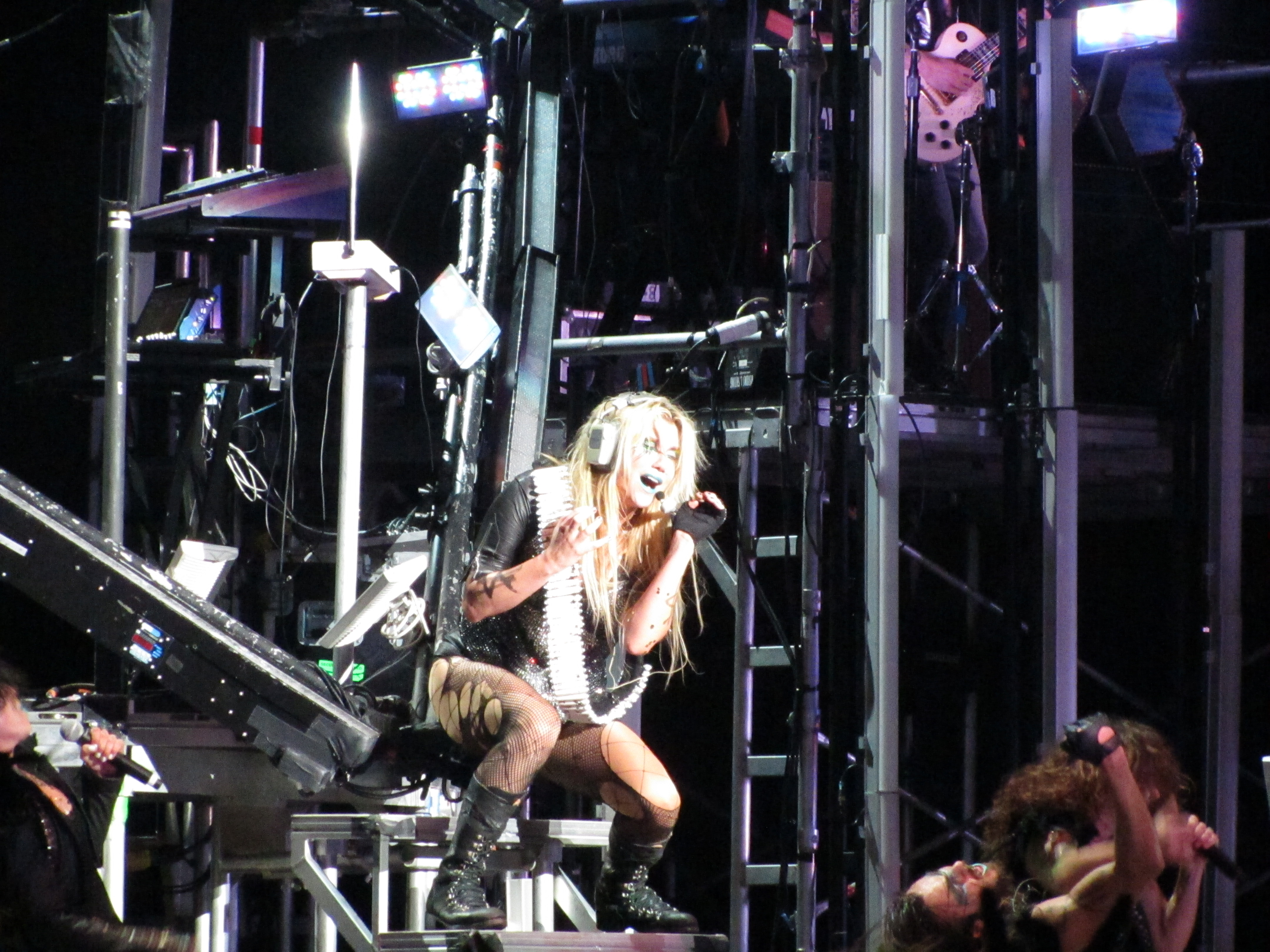
Kesha performing second single "Blow" during the Get Sleazy Tour in 2011

"We R Who We R" was released as the EP's lead single on October 22, 2010. Kesha said she was affected by the recent teenage suicides, in particular the suicide of Tyler Clementi, a young man who committed suicide after being outed as gay by his roommate. She elaborated, "I was really affected [...] having been subject to very public hatred [myself]. I have absolutely no idea how these kids felt. What I'm going through is nothing compared to what they had to go through. Just know things do get better and you need to celebrate who you are." With the release, Kesha stated that she hoped that the song would become an anthem for "weirdos", and said, "Every weird thing about you is beautiful and makes life interesting. Hopefully the song really captures that emotion of celebrating who you are." "We R Who We R" debuted at number one on the Billboard Hot 100 chart, selling over 280,000 digital copies. With this feat, the song became the seventeenth song in the history of the chart to debut at number one. The song also reached number one in Australia, on the United Kingdom Singles Chart and number two on the Canadian Hot 100, while charting within the top ten in numerous other countries.

"Blow" was released as the second single, and impacted U.S. radio on February 1, 2011. Critical reception of the song was generally mixed and positive. The song's hook and opening were generally praised but the song's chorus was met with mixed reaction, some critics praised the song for its party anthem vibe, while others called it uninspiring. Commercially, "Blow" reached the top ten in the United States and Australia, becoming her sixth straight top ten hit in both countries as a solo artist. The song also reached the top ten in New Zealand, and the top twenty in Canada.

=== Promotional singles ===
"Sleazy" was released as the first promotional single on October 29, 2010 as part of an iTunes exclusive countdown to the release of Cannibal. In Canada, the song entered the Canadian Hot 100 chart on the issue date entitled November 20, 2010 at forty-six. In the same week, "Sleazy" entered the Billboard Hot 100 chart at fifty-one. On the week of December 31, 2011, "Sleazy" re-entered the Billboard Hot 100 following the release of its official remix featuring Lil Wayne, Wiz Khalifa, T.I. & André 3000.

The title track, "Cannibal", was released as the second and last promotional single on November 9, 2010. In Canada, "Cannibal" entered the Canadian Hot 100 chart on the issue date entitled November 27, 2010 at sixty-two. In the same week, "Cannibal" entered the Billboard Hot 100 chart at seventy-seven. On the back of going viral on social network, TikTok, "Cannibal" re-entered the Canadian Hot 100 and climbed to a peak of 31 on the March 28, 2020 edition of the chart. The new found viral success also prompted Kesha to release a new lyric video for the song and her own dance collaboration with TikTok personality Charli D'Amelio.

== Critical reception ==
Professional ratings
Aggregate scores
Source	Rating
Metacritic	73/100
Review scores
Source	Rating
AllMusic	3.5/5 stars
The A.V. Club	B
Billboard	3.5/5 stars
Entertainment Weekly	B+
Now Magazine	2/5 stars
The Phoenix	3.5/4 stars
Popmatters	7/10 discs
Rolling Stone	3.5/5 stars
Slant Magazine	3.5/5 stars
Spin	5/10

Cannibal received generally positive reviews from music critics upon its release. The album holds a score of 73 out of 100 based on 11 critical reviews, according to the music review aggregator Metacritic. Stephen Thomas Erlewine from AllMusic was positive in his review of Cannibal. Erlewine was somewhat critical of the choice to release the EP noting that the only real reason for the release was that Animal had been "squeezed dry of hits". Although critical of the re-release, Thomas's consensus of the album was positive, writing: "aided by the tight focus of an eight-track EP, Cannibal's brevity trumping the scattershot Animal—but what makes them stick is Kesha, a pop star lacking pop star looks and a pop star voice. She's all ravenous id, spitting at strangers and backstabbing friends, humiliating hotties, and laughing at the wreckage in her wake. She is who she is and she offers no apologies." Leah Greenblatt of Entertainment Weekly commented on Kesha's writing of the album noting that her "herky-jerky rhymes still sound like they came from the bathroom wall of a reform-school kindergarten", not citing that as a negative but instead noting that the album had a "sulfurous end-of-days whiff about it". Greenblatt ended her review of the album giving it a rating of "B+" and called "Sleazy" and "Blow" the standout tracks on the album. Will Hermes from Rolling Stone noted that Kesha's main pop competitor was Lady Gaga writing, "This EP proves Kesha would kick Gaga's ass in a freestyle battle" praising her rhyming and production by Dr. Luke calling Kesha the "snap queen of clubland." Chad Grischow from IGN met the album with a positive review, giving the album a score of 6.5 out of 10. Grischow was critical of the production of the album and overuse of Auto-Tune writing that there was "so much overdubbing and autotune used that most of the songs may as well be sung by a spunky robot". He also noted that when Kesha's vocals were stripped down she could actually sing, highlighting the ballads "The Harold Song" and "C U Next Tuesday" in the album's review. Grischow ended his review writing, "Cannibal proves to be too mired in mindless lyrics and excessive vocal effects to have any lasting appeal."

Sal Cinquemani from Slant Magazine met the album with a mixed to positive review. Cinquemani wrote that Kesha was able to pull off authentic and unapologetic lyrics with ease, noting that this was something her pop-peers could not do. A complaint on the review was that the album was too similar to Animal, noting that she failed to "branch out in any significant way" and the overuse of processed vocals. Cinquemani ended the review praising the "Animal (Billboard Remix)" for its "promise of something deeper, something beyond Dr. Luke's latest recycled formula." Gary Graff from Billboard wrote "Kesha sinks her teeth into some fresh flavors on Cannibal, which will certainly enhance her 'Animal' attraction." Spin magazine's Barry Walters reviewed Cannibal with a mixed outcome giving the album five out of a possible ten stars. Walters criticized the album as a whole stating that it was full of contradictions, noting that on "We R Who We R" "she sends out pride vibes to bullied gays", while on "Grow a Pear", "she emasculates a potential boyfriend." The production of the album was stated as a positive, praising Dr. Luke for his consistent club-pop hooks and ability to "render the hypocrisy [of the album] nearly irrelevant." Mesfin Fekadu from The Boston Globe was mixed in his review of the album. Fekadu criticized the album's lyrical depth and use of auto-tune writing that the album was "filled with vapid lyrics and battles any T-Pain album for most use of the auto-tune." Kesha's mother, Pebe Sebert, was also targeted in the review criticizing her for helping write the album's title track, "Cannibal" which was called "disturbing" and "sad".

== Commercial performance ==
In the United States, Cannibal debuted on the Billboard 200 chart on the week of December 2, 2010 at number fifteen, selling 74,000 copies in its first week of release. The following week the album dropped twenty-six positions to position forty-one selling an additional 26,200 copies. After being present on the chart for two months the album sold 250,000 copies. By 2016, Cannibal sold 527,000 pure copies in the United States. In 2024, it received a double Platinum certification by the Recording Industry Association of America (RIAA) for sales of two million album-equivalent units. In Canada, Cannibal entered and peaked at number 14 on the Billboard Canadian Albums Chart.

In New Zealand following the release of Cannibal, her debut album Animal re-entered the RMNZ chart at number 34 as its reissue Animal + Cannibal, on the date issued November 29, 2010. Its re-entry on the chart also counted towards the stand-alone EP's debut position. On its fifth week, Animal + Cannibal re-entered the RMNZ chart on the date issued February 28, 2011, reaching an eventual peak position of 22, spending a total of 6 weeks on the chart, which also counted towards Animal's full 31 weeks on chart. Animal + Cannibal also appeared on the New Zealand end of year top 50 albums chart, ranking at number 30.

== Track listing ==
Cannibal – standard edition
No.	Title	Writer(s)	Producer(s)	Length
1.	"Cannibal"	Kesha Sebert; Joshua Coleman; Mathieu Jomphe; Pebe Sebert	Ammo; Billboard	3:14
2.	"We R Who We R"	K. Sebert; Coleman; Lukasz Gottwald; Jacob Kasher Hindlin; Benjamin Levin	Dr. Luke; Benny Blanco; Ammo	3:24
3.	"Sleazy"	K. Sebert; Klas Åhlund; Shondrae Crawford; Gottwald; Levin	Dr. Luke; Benny Blanco; Bangladesh	3:25
4.	"Blow"	K. Sebert; Åhlund; Gottwald; Allan Grigg; Levin; Max Martin	Dr. Luke; Max Martin; Benny Blanco; Kool Kojak	3:39
5.	"The Harold Song"	K. Sebert; Coleman	Ammo	3:58
6.	"Crazy Beautiful Life"	K. Sebert; Gottwald; Martin; P. Sebert	Dr. Luke	2:50
7.	"Grow a Pear"	K. Sebert; Gottwald; Levin; Martin	Dr. Luke; Max Martin; Benny Blanco	3:28
8.	"C U Next Tuesday"	K. Sebert; David Gamson; Marc Nelkin	David Gamson	3:45
9.	"Animal" (Billboard Remix)	K. Sebert; Gottwald; Greg Kurstin; P. Sebert	Greg Kurstin; Billboard^{[A]}	4:15
Total length:				31:58

Cannibal – Japanese and expanded edition bonus tracks
No.	Title	Writer(s)	Producer(s)	Length
10.	"Your Love Is My Drug" (Bimbo Jones Radio)	K. Sebert; P. Sebert; Coleman	Dr. Luke; Benny Blanco; Ammo	3:07
11.	"Take It Off" (Billboard Radio Mix)	K. Sebert; Gottwald; Claude Kelly	Dr. Luke	3:38
12.	"Animal" (Dave Audé Remix)	K. Sebert; P. Sebert; Gottwald; Kurstin	Greg Kurstin	4:36
Total length:				43:20

Notes

- ^{^A} signifies a remix producer
- The Cannibal version of "C U Next Tuesday" is censored, while also having a shorter outro compared to the Animal version of the track.

== Personnel ==
Credits adapted from the liner notes of Cannibal, Dynamite Cop Music/Where Da Kasz at BMI.

- Ammo – musician, producer, programming
- Billboard – additional production, mixing, musician, producer, programming, remixing
- Benny Blanco – musician, producer, programming
- Shondrae "Mr. Bangladesh" Crawford – musician, producer, programming
- Megan Dennis – production coordination
- Dr. Luke – executive producer, musician, producer, programming
- Eric Eylands – assistant
- Sarai Fiszel – make-up
- David Gamson – engineer, mixing, musician, producer, programming
- Chris Gehringer – mastering
- Serban Ghenea – mixing
- Erwin Gorostiza – creative director
- Aniela Gottwald – assistant
- Lukasz Gottwald – background vocals
- John Hanes – mixing
- Sam Holland – engineer, background vocals
- Chris "Hollywood" Holmes – engineer
- Kool Kojak – musician, producer, programming
- Greg Kurstin – producer
- Benjamin Levin – background vocals
- Marjan Malakpour – stylist
- Max Martin – musician, producer, programming
- Ramsell Martinez – hair stylist
- Chris "Tek" O'Ryan – engineer
- Irene Richter – production coordination
- Tim Roberts – mixing assistant
- Kesha Sebert – vocals
- Seth Waldmann – engineer
- Eric Weaver – engineer
- Emily Wright – engineer, background vocals

== Charts ==
=== Weekly charts ===
Weekly chart performance for Cannibal
Chart (2010–2011)	Peak position
Austria (Ö3 Austria) Animal + Cannibal	67
Canadian Albums (Billboard)	14
Greek Albums (IFPI) Animal + Cannibal	35
Hungarian Albums (MAHASZ) Animal + Cannibal	38
Irish Albums (IRMA) Animal + Cannibal	17
Japanese Albums (Oricon)	20
Japanese Top Album Sales (Billboard)	25
New Zealand Albums (RMNZ) Animal + Cannibal	22
South Korean Albums (Circle) Animal + Cannibal (Deluxe Edition)	19
South Korean International Albums (Circle) Animal + Cannibal (Deluxe Edition)	6
UK Albums (Official Charts) Animal + Cannibal	22
US Billboard 200	15

Chart (2021)	Peak position
US Top Dance Albums (Billboard)	4

=== Year-end charts ===
Year-end chart performance for Cannibal
Chart (2010)	Peak position
Austrian Albums (Ö3 Austria) Animal + Cannibal	44
New Zealand Albums (RMNZ) Animal + Cannibal	30

Chart (2011)	Peak position
US Billboard 200	69

== Certifications ==
Certifications for Cannibal
Region	Certification	Certified units/sales
United Kingdom (BPI)	Silver	60,000^{‡}
United States (RIAA)	2× Platinum	2,000,000^{‡}
^{‡} Sales+streaming figures based on certification alone.

Certifications for Animal + Cannibal
Region	Certification	Certified units/sales
New Zealand (RMNZ)	2× Platinum	30,000^{‡}
Sweden (GLF)	Gold	20,000^{‡}
^{‡} Sales+streaming figures based on certification alone.

== Release history ==
Region	Date	Label
Germany	November 19, 2010	Sony Music
Canada	November 22, 2010	Sony Music
United States	November 22, 2010	RCA Records
Japan	December 8, 2010	Sony Music Japan
China	February 18, 2011	Sony Music
