= Animal (Kesha album) =

2010 studio album by Kesha

Studio album by Kesha
- Released: January 1, 2010
- Recorded: 2007–2009
- Studios: Conway (Hollywood); Henson Recording (Hollywood); Dr. Luke's (Hollywood); ACME Recording (Long Beach); Ollywood (Hollywood); Kingsize Soundlabs (Eagle Rock); Lotzah Matzah Studios (New York City); Maratone (Stockholm); Love Minus Zero (London)
- Genres: Electropop; dance-pop
- Length: 46:18
- Label: RCA
- Producers: Ammo; Benny Blanco; David Gamson; Greg Kurstin; Dr. Luke; Max Martin; Tom Neville; Shellback

Kesha chronology
Animal (2010)	Cannibal (2010)

Singles from Animal
- 1. "Tik Tok" Released: August 7, 2009; 2. "Blah Blah Blah" Released: February 2, 2010; 3. "Your Love Is My Drug" Released: April 20, 2010; 4. "Take It Off" Released: July 13, 2010

Animal is the debut studio album by American singer and songwriter Kesha. The album was first released on January 1, 2010, by Sony Music, and was released in the United States on January 5, 2010, by RCA Records. Kesha worked on the album with a variety of record producers and songwriters such as Lukasz "Dr. Luke" Gottwald, Benny Blanco, David Gamson, Greg Kurstin, Max Martin and others. Kesha had been recording demos for several years when one eventually ended up in the hands of Samantha Cox, senior director of writer/publisher relations at BMI. Cox passed along the demo and it ended up in the hands of Gottwald, who decided to have Kesha perform on the song "Right Round" with American rapper Flo Rida. Within two months, the song became a hit in multiple countries around the world. The event led to Kesha being sought after by many major labels, and she eventually signed a multi-album deal with RCA Records.

Musically, Animal draws from the electropop genre, while incorporating elements of dance-pop in its production and beats. Lyrically, the majority of the album's songs are based on Kesha's past life experiences of love, heartbreak, boys, and having a good time. The album received mixed reviews from music critics. Some appreciated its fun, carefree nature, while others dismissed it as juvenile and said that it seemed insincere. The album attained chart success, debuting at number one on the Canadian Albums Chart, the Billboard 200 in the United States and the IFPI Greece Albums Chart, while charting within the top ten in seven other countries. Animal has since been certified 4× Platinum by the Recording Industry Association of America (RIAA) for sales of over 4 million equivalent units in the United States.

Four singles were released from the album. Its lead single, "Tik Tok", was released on August 7, 2009, and was a worldwide hit, reaching number one in eleven countries. It reached number one on the Billboard Hot 100 in the US and stayed at the top for nine consecutive weeks. The song sold 12.8 million digital copies worldwide in 2010, making it the best-selling single of the year; whereas 6.8 million of those downloads were sold in the United States alone, making it at the time the sixth best-selling song in digital history. The album's second, third and fourth singles ("Blah Blah Blah", "Your Love Is My Drug" and "Take It Off") all achieved similar success, reaching the top ten in multiple countries, including Australia, Canada and the United States. The album's commercial success led to its nomination for the Juno Award for Best International Album at the Juno Awards of 2011. On November 21, 2025, Kesha released a 15th anniversary edition of Animal + Cannibal, including two previously unreleased tracks.

== Background ==
Kesha had been recording demos for a few years when, at age 18, one of her demos ended up in the hands of Samantha Cox, senior director of writer/publisher relations at BMI. Cox, who had worked with Kesha before, passed along the demos to a friend at BMI, who passed it to the manager of Lukasz Gottwald, known as Dr. Luke. Kesha signed to Dr. Luke's label, Kemosabe Records, and his publishing company, Prescription Songs. Luke was busy with other projects at the time, and Kesha ultimately wound up signed to David Sonenberg's management company, DAS, where she worked with several top writers and producers, but rarely with Luke. DAS searched for a label deal for Kesha despite her still being in a signed contract with Luke. Kara DioGuardi, an artists and repertoire (A&R) representative for Warner, was also interested in signing Kesha but the deal never went through because of the outstanding contract with Luke. Shortly after, Kesha and DAS parted ways and Kesha wound up reunited with Luke.

At the end of 2008, Luke was working on a track with Flo Rida called "Right Round" for his album R.O.O.T.S., and the two decided they needed a female hook. Luke decided to have Kesha perform on the song and within two months, it was a number one hit in multiple countries around the world. The event led to Kesha being sought after by many major labels, and she eventually signed a multi-album deal with RCA Records. Kesha explained that she chose to sign with the company due to how well she got along with RCA A&R executive Rani Hancock, explaining that "Rani doesn't ever try to censor me, [...] and I like being surrounded by strong, intelligent women."

== Development and inspiration ==
"Animal, the name of the record, it's kind of my steez [style], I have to say. I named it that because I want people to lose it when they listen to my record and go to the animal part of themselves that they suppress. Society has taught us to suppress certain things and not do certain things."

— Kesha, on the inspiration for the album title.

Kesha had been working on Animal for seven years prior to its release, and had written over 200 songs for the album. The abundance of material extended it from its initially planned twelve tracks to fourteen. Kesha felt that the album had an empowering, carefree message for young women. "For girls, I think it's an empowering record, it's funny, it's cheeky," she said. "I think people need to have fun with whatever they're doing—makeup, their clothes, music, live shows—anything you don't need to take too seriously, don't take too seriously." When asked how the album related to her life, Kesha explained that the album was completely autobiographical. "I just write about what I live—literally, [...] I think there's a great pop song in anything and everything, any situation." She cites her songs "Stephen" and "Dinosaur" as examples of this. She explained: "it's about this guy I've been stalking since I was 15. I wrote the song when I was 16 with my mom, and I was like, "This song's so dope, I know it is". "Dinosaur" came "about [when] this old guy who was hitting on me, and his toupee was kind of falling off, and I was like, "Oh my God, you're so old, you're prehistoric, you're like a dinosaur. D-I-N-O-S-A-you are a dinosaur." Explaining the reasoning behind the title track being placed at the end of the album's track list, Kesha said:

"I believe, sonically, [it's where] the next record might be going. Me and my brother had a silly punk band before, and I loved pop music and I liked catchy music, but I think I also am possessed to be what some critics might deem as silly pop music. I think I have more shit to offer, so I think that "Animal" is a nice segue into the next record, hopefully."

== Music and lyrics ==
"Boots & Boys"
"Boots & Boys" is a "lusty" song reminiscent of INXS's "Suicide Blonde".

"Party at a Rich Dude's House"
"Party at a Rich Dude's House" is reminiscent of music from the 1980s.

Musically, Animal has been described as electropop and dance-pop, while incorporating elements of electro in its production and beats. Kesha's vocals uses Auto-Tune and vocoders to alter her voice and includes samples. David Jeffries of AllMusic noted that the album lyrically revolves around avoiding reality with a preference for a "garbage chic" life, with lyrics such as "Maybe I need some rehab, or maybe just need some sleep" from the opening song "Your Love Is My Drug". Lyrically, the majority of the album's songs are based on Kesha's past life experiences of love, heartbreak, boys, and having a good time. "Your Love Is My Drug" is a dance song that is layered with a heavy electronic backdrop. Her vocals throughout the song have been described as a shouty sing-speak style. Musically, the song uses a simple, upbeat lyric line. On "Tik Tok" Kesha uses a spoken word rap style on the verses while the chorus is sung. According to her the lyrics are representative of herself, stating "it's about my life, it's 100 per cent me". "Take It Off" has been described as "a heavily Auto-Tuned reworking" of "There's a Place in France".

"Kiss n Tell"'s lyrics depict a tale of the "'slutty' ex of [Kesha] [who is] spreading his wild oats around the town". The writing of the song came about after Kesha discovered that her boyfriend was cheating on her with a famous pop starlet. "Kiss n Tell" is a dance-pop track that features standard elements of "party pop" music that is prominent on Animal. According to sheet music published at Musicnotes.com by Sony/ATV Music Publishing, "Kiss n Tell" is written in the time signature of common time, with a moderate beat rate of 144 beats per minute. The song is written in the key of E Major and Kesha's vocal range in the song spans from the note of G♯_{3} to the note of B_{4}. "Stephen" is opened in "Kansas-style vocal harmonies" as Kesha sings about an unattainable lover depicting their story. "Blah Blah Blah" combines heavy use of Auto-Tune with drum machines while infusing hints of R&B. Lyrically, "Blah Blah Blah" (featuring 3OH!3) depicts a woman who would rather have sex than listen to a man speak. "Dinosaur" features a whistle-synth infused backing while the lyrics describe the story of older men hitting on younger girls. "Party at a Rich Dude's House" is reminiscent of music from the 1980s which according to Jeffries could have appeared on the soundtrack to the 1982 film Fast Times at Ridgemont High. "Dancing with Tears in My Eyes" is an upbeat pop-rock ballad; one of a small minority of tracks to incorporate guitars in the instrumental, as Kesha tried to exclude the style from the album. "Boots & Boys" is a "lusty" song reminiscent of INXS's "Suicide Blonde", but from a female point of view.

== Release and promotion ==
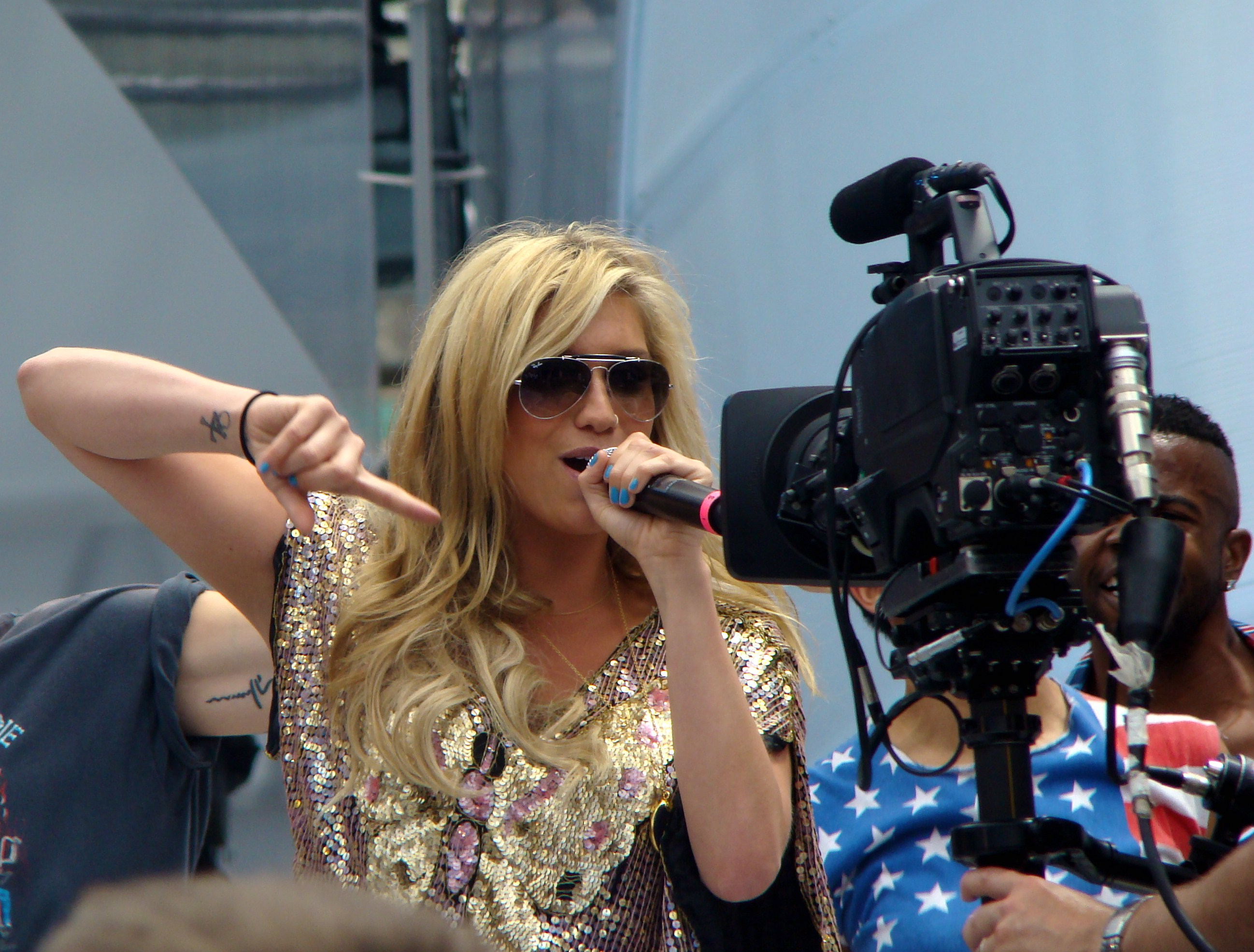
Kesha at 2010 MuchMusic Video Awards soundcheck on June 20, 2010

RCA noticed Kesha's strong following on social media when negotiating her contract and thus relied on viral marketing to build a following for her debut single, "Tik Tok" offering it for free a month before releasing it for digital download. "Tik Tok" was released for digital download in August 2009 and reached number one on iTunes in New Zealand without radio airplay. Radio stations soon began expressing interest in the song, but RCA/Jive Label Group chairman/CEO Barry Weiss decided to delay its shipping to radio by a month, to October, to let the song continue to build viral support digitally and good word of mouth. While "Tik Tok"'s airplay was not stellar right out of the gates, it soon gained enough momentum to give RCA the go ahead to release Animal in January 2010. Finance executives had pushed for a Christmas release to capitalize on the usual strong sales during that time period, but Weiss thought that the album would be lost in the shuffle among the many other releases released at that time. Animal was released in Denmark, Italy and Philippines on New Year, January 1, 2010. It was released in North America and Spain four days later.

To promote the album, Kesha did several performances worldwide. Her first performance was on MTV Push, a program broadcast on MTV Networks worldwide. She made several television appearances across North America to promote the album: It's on with Alexa Chung, The Wendy Williams Show, Lopez Tonight, Late Night with Jimmy Fallon, The Tonight Show with Conan O'Brien, and The Ellen DeGeneres Show. "Blah Blah Blah" was performed on January 18, 2010, at MuchOnDemand. While in the United Kingdom, Kesha made two appearances on television to promote the album and "Blah Blah Blah". The first was on February 18, 2010, on Alan Carr: Chatty Man. It was followed by a performance on breakfast television show GMTV, on February 19. The song was also performed live on season 9 of American Idol on March 17, 2010. She wore her trademark glitter eye make-up and bounced throughout the stage while her backup dancers were dressed as human TV sets showing intermittent images of the American flag, owls, and skulls. The performance was accompanied by 3OH!3.

Kesha performed "Your Love Is My Drug" and "Tik Tok" on a season 35 episode of Saturday Night Live hosted by Ryan Phillippe on April 17, 2010. On May 29, 2010, Kesha performed "Your Love Is My Drug" alongside her previous single "Tik Tok" at the MTV Video Music Awards Japan. She performed a set for BBC Radio 1's Big Weekend. On August 13, 2010, Kesha performed "Take It Off" alongside earlier singles "Your Love Is My Drug" and "Tik Tok" on NBC's Today. In the performance she was seen wearing boots, fishnets, glitter shorts and a loose tank top. By the second verse, her dancers – dressed head to toe in black – started to appropriately undress to the music as the chorus starts revealing gold shirts and tank-tops. The performance featured smoke machines with Kesha playing notes on an electric keyboard while crawling on the floor. Her performance of "Backstabber" for the Bud Light Hotel Super Bowl event on February 5, 2011, was broadcast on February 9 on Jimmy Kimmel Live! On October 25, 2026, Kesha revealed that the "Backstabber" music video, which was recorded in September 2009, would be released on October 26 after spending 16 years unreleased. It will be released on a limited edition 7-inch vinyl in the shape of a knife, with "Cannibal" as the B-side. The explicit version was released on streaming platforms on November 6, 2026.

== Singles ==
"Tik Tok" was released as the album's lead single commercially worldwide on August 7, 2009, through digital distribution. Upon its release the single generated mixed to generally positive reviews. Critics generally praised the lyrics and celebration of party lifestyle; the song's production was generally well received although some critics criticized the song for sounding irritating and being too similar to other tracks performed by the likes of Lady Gaga and Uffie. The song achieved commercial success by topping charts in eleven countries, as well as reaching the top 10 in many other countries. It reached number one on the Billboard Hot 100 and stayed at the top for nine consecutive weeks. "Tik Tok" had sold over 6 million downloads in the United States alone and 15 million worldwide, making it the second best-selling song in digital history. The song sold 12.8 million digital copies worldwide in 2010, making it the best selling single of the year, beating the previous year's song by more than three million downloads.

"Blah Blah Blah" was released as the second single from the album on February 2, 2010. It had charted before being released in the album's debut week in the United States due to strong digital download sales on par with "Tik Tok", which influenced RCA's decision to release it as the next single. The song also debuted and peaked in the top 10 in three other countries under similar circumstances, only improving upon its peak in Australia. The single was met with mixed reaction from music critics, some praised Kesha's unapologetic lyrics combined with an auto-tuned working hook, while others called it trashy. Although reviews were mainly positive, a common complaint amongst critics was the appearance of 3OH!3.

"Your Love Is My Drug" was released as the album's third single. The song generated generally positive reviews from music critics. Critics complimented the song for its strong hook, but had mixed reactions about the chorus. Kesha was praised for knowing her way around a "strong pop chorus", while others critics called it predictable and dull. It reached the top 10 in the United States, the Canadian Hot 100, and Australia—peaking at number four, six and three—giving her her third consecutive top 10 hit in all regions. The single reached the top ten in five countries.

"Take It Off" was released on July 13, 2010, as the album's fourth and final single. Upon its release the single generated mixed reviews from music critics. A common complaint amongst critics was the demonstration of overly processed vocals with the use of auto-tune. Other critics complimented the song for its carefree dance feel and its catchiness. Due to strong digital sales from the release of Animal, the song charted in the United States, the United Kingdom Singles Chart, and Canada before being announced as a single. After being released as a single the song reached the top ten in Canada, Australia and the United States. It has also reached the top twenty in Ireland, the United Kingdom and New Zealand.

== Critical reception ==
Professional ratings
Aggregate scores
Source	Rating
Metacritic	54/100
Review scores
Source	Rating
AllMusic	3/5 stars
Billboard	3.5/5 stars
Entertainment Weekly	B+
The Guardian	2/5 stars
Los Angeles Times	3/4 stars
musicOMH	4/5 stars
NME	5/10 stars
The Phoenix	3/4 stars
Pitchfork	7.3/10
Slant Magazine	1.5/5 stars

Animal received generally mixed reviews from music critics upon its release. The album holds a score of 54 out of 100 based on 18 critical reviews, according to the music review aggregator Metacritic. Ann Powers of the Los Angeles Times stated that Kesha was "offer[ing] a thoroughly fleshed-out character to embrace or despise," comparing her persona to "classic screwball blond[s]" such as Jean Harlow and Mae West, while praising her and Dr. Luke for "refashion[ing] the screwball heroine role to suit a new era of aggressive superficiality and libertine self-empowerment". Her conclusion about Kesha and the album was that "[h]er total commitment to the deliberately stupid script Animal provides makes [the album] work." Ailbhe Malone of NME gave Animal a mixed review but concluded that "[b]eneath the patina of skeezy Freshers'-Week-LOLZ lyrics ('got a water-bottle full of whiskey in my handbag')" it seems there "lies a talent." Andrew Burgess of MusicOMH was impressed with Kesha, calling her an "auto-tuned talk-singing, gum-smacker" that may well be "a pop-genius, a gutter-glam Jonathan Swift." He described the album as "an infectiously good dance-pop album." Daniel Brockman of The Phoenix thought that the album was "a clear subversion of pop norms" with "effortless hooks".

Monica Herrera of Billboard commented that the prevalent use of Auto-Tune on Kesha's vocals made it difficult to tell if she could actually sing, citing the song "Take It Off" as an example of "how easily individuality can get lost in a sea of Auto-Tune". On the other hand, Herrera was impressed with the "choruses that stick with the listener for days." David Jeffries of AllMusic was not impressed with the album's ballads, calling them "completely unsatisfying." However, he noted "that with so many fun, 'Tik Tok'-type tracks, the album has plenty for both brats and the bratty at heart." James Reed of The Boston Globe believed that Kesha's "personality is completely missing from [the songs]," resulting in her sounding "vapid and faceless." Jonathan Keefe of Slant Magazine was extremely critical of the album and Kesha, saying that her attempts to sing and rap were "pitiful", describing her as "insincere" and "souless". Dave Simpson of The Guardian also questioned the honesty of her lyrics while comparing her unfavorably to Lady Gaga, Katy Perry, and Britney Spears.

== Commercial performance ==
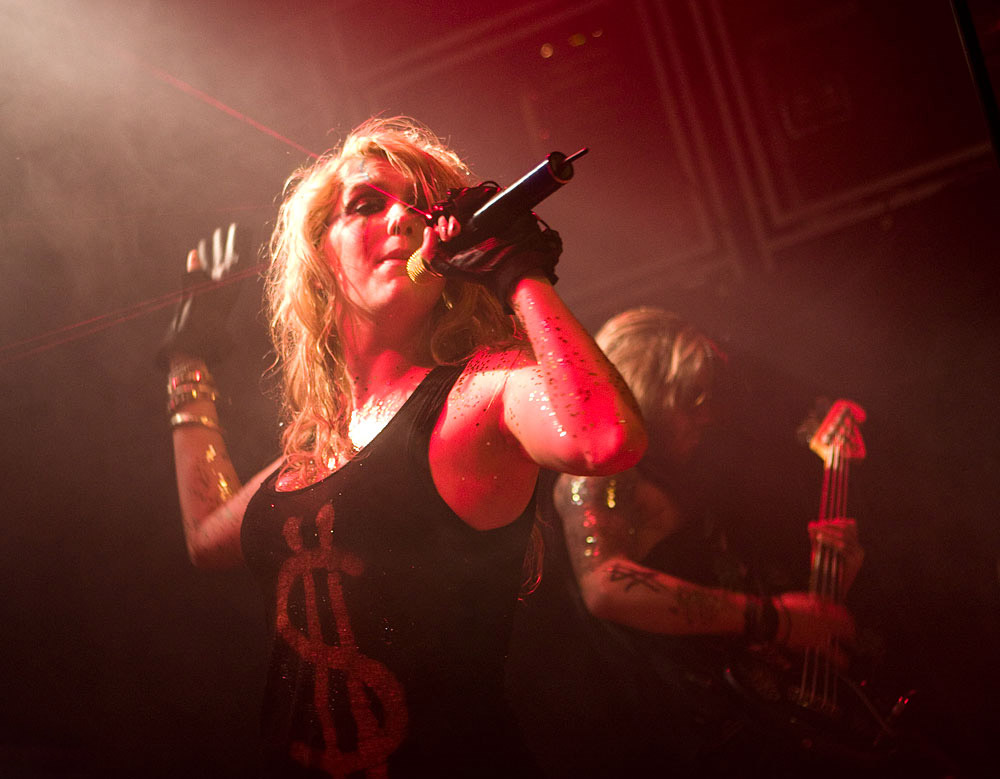
Kesha at Studio Juste Pour Rire on January 24, 2010

In the United States, Animal debuted at number one on the Billboard 200 on the week of January 23, 2010, with sales of 152,000 copies (setting a record for digital sales of a number one album, at 76%). With "Tik Tok" occupying the top spot on the Billboard Hot 100 at the same time, Kesha became the first act to achieve this feat since 2008 when Spirit and "Bleeding Love" by Leona Lewis simultaneously held the pole positions. At the end of 2010, the album peaked at number 20 on Billboard's year-end chart. Animal became the tenth best-selling album in the United States of 2010, selling 1.14 million copies that year. By 2016, the album has since sold 1.47 million pure copies in the country alone. As of September 2024, the album has since received a 4× Platinum certification by the Recording Industry Association of America (RIAA) for sales in recognition of 4 million album-equivalent units.

In Canada, the album debuted at number one on the Canadian Albums Chart with sales of 16,000 copies, later going on to become the biggest-selling digital album in the country. On the Canadian album year-end chart the album peaked at number 12. In May 2011, the album was certified double platinum by the Canadian Recording Industry Association (CRIA) for shipment of 160,000 units. The album was released a month later in the United Kingdom and debuted at number eight on the UK Albums Chart with first week sales of 18,723 copies.

In Australia, the album debuted at number four, where it stayed consecutively for two weeks before falling to the number five position. On the Australian 2010 year-end chart, the album peaked at number 11. The album has since been certified double platinum by the Australian Recording Industry Association (ARIA) for sales of 140,000 copies. Animal was released on January 11, 2010, in New Zealand, and had debuted at its peak position of number six on the RMNZ chart. Following the release of Cannibal, the album later re-entered the RMNZ chart at 34 as its reissue Animal + Cannibal, on the date issued November 29, 2010, spending a total of 31 non-consecutive weeks on the chart. The album also appeared on the New Zealand 2010 top 50 albums year-end chart, ranking at number 30. As of April 2026, Animal has since received a triple platinum certification in the country by Recorded Music NZ (RMNZ), for sales of 45,000 units.

== Track listing ==
Animal track listing
No.	Title	Writer(s)	Producer(s)	Length
1.	"Your Love Is My Drug"	Kesha Sebert; Pebe Sebert; Joshua Coleman	Dr. Luke; Benny Blanco; Ammo	3:06
2.	"Tik Tok"	K. Sebert; Lukasz Gottwald; Benjamin Levin	Dr. Luke; Blanco	3:19
3.	"Take It Off"	K. Sebert; Gottwald; Claude Kelly	Dr. Luke	3:35
4.	"Kiss n Tell"	K. Sebert; Gottwald; Max Martin; Shellback	Dr. Luke; Max Martin	3:27
5.	"Stephen"	K. Sebert; P. Sebert; David Gamson; Oliver Leiber	Gamson; Leiber^{[A]}	3:32
6.	"Blah Blah Blah" (featuring 3OH!3)	K. Sebert; Levin; Neon Hitch; Sean Foreman	Blanco	2:52
7.	"Hungover"	K. Sebert; Gottwald; Martin; Shellback	Dr. Luke; Martin; Ammo^{[B]}	3:52
8.	"Party at a Rich Dude's House"	K. Sebert; Shellback; Levin	Shellback; Blanco	2:55
9.	"Backstabber"	K. Sebert; Gamson; Marc Nelkin; Jon Ingoldsby	Gamson	3:06
10.	"Blind"	K. Sebert; Gottwald; Levin; Coleman	Dr. Luke; Blanco; Ammo	3:17
11.	"Dinosaur"	K. Sebert; Martin; Shellback	Martin; Shellback	2:55
12.	"Dancing with Tears in My Eyes"	K. Sebert; Gottwald; Levin; Kelly	Dr. Luke; Blanco	3:29
13.	"Boots & Boys"	K. Sebert; Tom Neville; Olivia Nervo; Miriam Nervo	Neville	2:56
14.	"Animal"	K. Sebert; P. Sebert; Gottwald; Greg Kurstin	Kurstin	3:57
Total length:				46:18

International edition bonus track
No.	Title	Writer(s)	Producer(s)	Length
15.	"VIP"	K. Sebert; Neville; O. Nervo; M. Nervo	Neville; O. Nervo^{[C]}; M. Nervo^{[C]}	3:31
Total length:				49:49

UK edition bonus track
No.	Title	Writer(s)	Producer(s)	Length
16.	"Dirty Picture Pt. 2" (featuring Taio Cruz)	K. Sebert; Cruz; Fraser T Smith; Gottwald; Levin	Fraser T Smith; Cruz; Dr. Luke^{[C]}; Blanco^{[C]}	3:39
Total length:				53:28

Korean digital edition bonus track
No.	Title	Writer(s)	Producer(s)	Length
16.	"Tik Tok" (Wolfedelic club mix)	K. Sebert; Gottwald; Levin	Dr. Luke; Blanco; The Wolf^{[D]}	6:16
Total length:				56:05

Row DTC exclusive edition bonus track
No.	Title	Writer(s)	Producer(s)	Length
16.	"Tik Tok" (Cooly G mix)	K. Sebert; Gottwald; Levin	Dr. Luke; Blanco; Cooly G^{[D]}	3:49
Total length:				53:38

Japanese edition, Australian deluxe edition, and expanded edition bonus tracks
No.	Title	Writer(s)	Producer(s)	Length
16.	"C U Next Tuesday"	K. Sebert; Gamson; Nelkin	Gamson	3:52
17.	"Tik Tok" (Wolfedelic club mix)	K. Sebert; Gottwald; Levin	Dr. Luke; Blanco; The Wolf^{[D]}	6:16
18.	"Tik Tok" (Fred Falke club remix)	K. Sebert; Gottwald; Levin	Dr. Luke; Blanco; Fred Falke^{[D]}	6:42
Total length:				66:39

Australian deluxe edition DVD
No.	Title	Length
1.	"Dinosaur" (live in London)
2.	"Blah Blah Blah" (live in London)
3.	"Party at a Rich Dude's House" (live in London)
4.	"Tik Tok" (live in London)
5.	"Blah Blah Blah" (music video; featuring 3OH!3)
6.	"Tik Tok" (music video)
7.	"Your Love Is My Drug" (music video)
8.	"Manchester" (Webisode–Kesha on the Road)

Japanese limited edition DVD
No.	Title	Length
1.	"Dinosaur" (live in London)
2.	"Blah Blah Blah" (live in London)
3.	"Party at a Rich Dude's House" (live in London)
4.	"Tik Tok" (live in London)
5.	"Blah Blah Blah" (music video; featuring 3OH!3)
6.	"Tik Tok" (music video)
7.	"Manchester" (Webisode–Kesha on the Road)
8.	"The Showcase" (Webisode–Kesha on the Road)
9.	"London" (Webisode–Kesha on the Road)
10.	"Amsterdam" (Webisode–Kesha on the Road)
11.	"G.A.Y" (Webisode–Kesha on the Road)
12.	"Behind the Scenes at TVC" (Webisode–Kesha on the Road)

=== Notes ===
- The Animal version of "C U Next Tuesday" is uncensored, while also having a longer outro compared to the Cannibal version of the track.
- The track "Blah Blah Blah" featuring 3OH!3 is omitted on the Chinese CD release due to Chinese censorship laws.

=== Animal + Cannibal ===
Originally planned to only be a re-release of Animal, Cannibal was instead released both as part of a reissue of Animal as well as a stand-alone EP. The EP has been classified as a follow-up "nine-song companion" record to Animal. Cannibal was originally intended to contain anywhere between four and eight tracks with the outcome consisting of eight tracks and one previously heard song remixed, for a total of nine tracks.

To celebrate the 15th anniversary of the album, Kesha released a special edition on November 21, 2025, and included two previously unreleased tracks, "Butterscotch" and "Shots on the Hood of My Car".

Disc one: Animal
No.	Title	Writer(s)	Producer(s)	Length
1.	"Your Love Is My Drug"	K. Sebert; Pebe Sebert; Joshua Coleman	Dr. Luke; Blanco; Ammo	3:06
2.	"Tik Tok"	K. Sebert; Gottwald; Levin	Dr. Luke; Blanco	3:19
3.	"Take It Off"	K. Sebert; Gottwald; Kelly	Dr. Luke	3:35
4.	"Kiss n Tell"	K. Sebert; Gottwald; Martin; Shellback	Dr. Luke; Martin	3:27
5.	"Stephen"	K. Sebert; Gamson; P. Sebert; Leiber	Gamson; Leiber^{[A]}	3:32
6.	"Blah Blah Blah" (featuring 3OH!3)	K. Sebert; Levin; Hitch; Foreman	Blanco	2:52
7.	"Hungover"	K. Sebert; Gottwald; Martin; Shellback	Dr. Luke; Martin; Ammo	3:52
8.	"Party at a Rich Dude's House"	K. Sebert; Shellback; Levin	Shellback; Blanco	2:55
9.	"Backstabber"	K. Sebert; Gamson; Nelkin; Ingoldsby	Gamson	3:06
10.	"Blind"	K. Sebert; Gottwald; Levin; Coleman	Dr. Luke; Blanco; Ammo	3:17
11.	"Dinosaur"	K. Sebert; Martin; Shellback	Martin; Shellback	2:55
12.	"Dancing with Tears in My Eyes"	K. Sebert; Gottwald; Levin; Kelly	Dr. Luke; Blanco	3:29
13.	"Boots & Boys"	K. Sebert; Neville; O. Nervo; M. Nervo	Neville	2:56
14.	"Animal"	K. Sebert; P. Sebert; Gottwald; Kurstin	Kurstin	3:57
Total length:				46:18

UK edition
No.	Title	Writer(s)	Producer(s)	Length
15.	"VIP"	K. Sebert; Neville; O. Nervo; M. Nervo	Neville; O. Nervo^{[C]}; M. Nervo^{[C]}	3:31
16.	"Dirty Picture Pt. 2" (featuring Taio Cruz)	K. Sebert; Cruz; Smith; Gottwald; Levin	Fraser T Smith; Cruz; Dr. Luke^{[C]}; Blanco^{[C]}	3:39
Total length:				53:28

Japanese edition
No.	Title	Writer(s)	Producer(s)	Length
16.	"Tik Tok" (Wolfadelic club mix)	K. Sebert; Gottwald; Levin	Dr. Luke; Blanco; The Wolf^{[D]}	6:16
17.	"Tik Tok" (Fred Falke club remix)	K. Sebert; Gottwald; Levin	Dr. Luke; Blanco; Fred Falke^{[D]}	6:42
Total length:				62:47

15th Anniversary Edition
No.	Title	Writer(s)	Producer(s)	Length
15.	"VIP"	K. Sebert; Neville; O. Nervo; M. Nervo	Neville; O. Nervo^{[C]}; M. Nervo^{[C]}	3:31
16.	"Butterscotch"	K. Sebert; P. Sebert; Evan Bogart; Michael Busbee	Busbee	3:16

Disc two: Cannibal
No.	Title	Writer(s)	Producer(s)	Length
1.	"Cannibal"	K. Sebert; Coleman; Mathieu Jomphe; P. Sebert	Ammo; Billboard	3:14
2.	"We R Who We R"	K. Sebert; Coleman; Gottwald; Jacob Kasher Hindlin; Levin	Dr. Luke; Blanco; Ammo	3:24
3.	"Sleazy"	K. Sebert; Klas Åhlund; Shondrae Crawford; Gottwald; Levin	Dr. Luke; Bangladesh; Blanco	3:25
4.	"Blow"	K. Sebert; Åhlund; Gottwald; Allan Grigg; Levin; Martin	Dr. Luke; Martin; Blanco; Kool Kojak	3:40
5.	"The Harold Song"	K. Sebert; Coleman	Ammo	3:58
6.	"Crazy Beautiful Life"	K. Sebert; Gottwald; P. Sebert; Martin	Dr. Luke	2:50
7.	"Grow a Pear"	K. Sebert; Gottwald; Levin; Martin	Dr. Luke; Martin; Blanco	3:28
8.	"C U Next Tuesday"	K. Sebert; Gamson; Nelkin	Gamson	3:45
9.	"Animal" (Billboard remix)	K. Sebert; Gottwald; Kurstin; P. Sebert	Kurstin; Billboard^{[D]}	4:15
10.	"Stephen" (music video)			3:32
11.	"Animal" (music video)			3:57
12.	"Take It Off" (K$ N' Friends version music video)			3:35
Total length:				43:03

UK edition
No.	Title	Writer(s)	Producer(s)	Length
10.	"The Sleazy Remix" (featuring André 3000)	K. Sebert; Åhlund; Crawford; Gottwald; Levin; André Benjamin	Dr. Luke; Bangladesh; Blanco	3:49
11.	"Stephen" (music video)			3:32
12.	"Animal" (music video)			3:57
13.	"Take It Off" (K$ N' Friends version music video)			3:35
Total length:				46:52

Japanese edition
No.	Title	Writer(s)	Producer(s)	Length
10.	"Your Love Is My Drug" (Bimbo Jones radio)	K. Sebert; P. Sebert; Coleman	Dr. Luke; Blanco; Ammo	3:07
11.	"Take It Off" (Billboard radio mix)	K. Sebert; Gottwald; Kelly	Dr. Luke	3:38
12.	"Animal" (Dave Audé remix)	K. Sebert; P. Sebert; Gottwald; Kurstin	Kurstin; Billboard	4:36
13.	"Stephen" (music video)			3:32
14.	"Animal" (music video)			3:57
15.	"Take It Off" (K$ N' Friends version music video)			3:35
Total length:				54:24

15th Anniversary Edition
No.	Title	Writer(s)	Producer(s)	Length
26.	"Blow" (Cirkut remix)	K. Sebert; Åhlund; Gottwald; Grigg; Levin; Martin	Dr. Luke; Martin; Blanco; Kool Kojak	4:05
27.	"Fuck Him, He's a DJ"	K. Sebert; Neville; O. Nervo; M. Nervo	Neville; O. Nervo; M. Nervo	3:44
28.	"Dirty Picture Pt. 2" (featuring Taio Cruz)	K. Sebert; Cruz; Smith; Gottwald; Levin	Fraser T Smith; Cruz; Dr. Luke^{[C]}; Blanco^{[C]}	3:39
29.	"Shots on the Hood of My Car"	K. Sebert; P. Sebert; Gamson; Sophie Slern	Gamson	4:22

== Personnel ==
Credits adapted from the liner notes of Animal.

- Matt Beckley – recording engineer (track 1)
- Benny Blanco – drums (tracks 1–2, 6, 10, 12), keyboards (1–2, 6, 10, 12), music programming (1–2, 6, 8, 10, 12), producer (1–2, 6, 8, 10, 12), recording engineer (2, 6, 8), instrumentation (8)
- Anita Marisa Boriboon – art direction, design
- Graham Bryce – background vocals (track 3)
- Joshua "Ammo" Coleman – drums (1, 7, 10), keyboards (1, 7, 10), music programming (1, 7, 10), producer (1, 7, 10)
- Emily De Groot – stylist
- Megan Dennis – production coordination (tracks 1, 3, 10, 12)
- Shelby Duncan – photography
- Eric Eylands – assistant recording engineer (track 4)
- Sarai Fiszel – make-up
- Sean Foreman – additional vocals (track 6)
- David Gamson – music programming, producer, recording engineer, additional instruments (tracks 5, 9)
- Chris Gehringer – mastering
- Serban Ghenea – audio mixing (all tracks)
- Erwin Gorostiza – creative director
- Aniela Gottwald – background vocals (track 3), assistant recording engineer (4)
- Lukasz "Doctor Luke" Gottwald – composer (tracks 2–4, 7, 10, 12), guitar (7), drums (1–4, 7, 10, 12), keyboards (1–4, 7, 10, 12), music programming (1–4, 7, 10, 12), producer (1–4, 7, 10, 12), engineer (10), executive producer, vocal editing, background vocals (3)
- Tatiana Gottwald – background vocals (track 3), assistant vocal editing (2)
- Rani Hancock – artists and repertoire
- John Hanes – engineer
- Sam Holland – recording engineer (tracks 2–4, 12)
- Jim Hynes – trumpet (track 9)
- Claude Kelly – background vocals (3)
- Greg Kurstin – keyboards, music programming, producer, recording engineer (track 14)
- Oliver Leiber – producer, recording engineer (track 5)
- Max Martin – keyboards (11), producer (4, 7, 11), recording engineer (11)
- Ramsell Martinez – hair stylist
- Marc Nelkin – composer (track 9)
- Miriam Nervo – background vocals, vocal producer (track 13)
- Olivia Nervo – background vocals, vocal producer (track 13)
- Tom Neville – instrumental arranger, music producer, recording engineer, instrumentation (track 13)
- Chris "Tek" O'Ryan – sound engineer
- The Pickleheadz – background vocals (track 3)
- Tim Roberts – mixing assistant
- Becky Scott – production coordination (tracks 1, 3, 10, 12)
- Kesha Sebert – vocals (tracks 1–2, 4–5, 7–12, 14, lead – 3, 6, 13), accordion (track 5), cowbell (11), whistle (11)
- Shellback – music programming (8), producer (8, 11), recording engineer (8, 11), instrumentation (8), whistle (11)
- Vanessa Silberman – music production assistant (track 2), production coordination (1, 3, 10, 12)
- Gary "G" Silver – production coordination (track 2)
- Andrew Snitzer – saxophone (track 9)
- Yasmin Than – stylist
- Seth Waldmann – recording engineer (track 4)
- Emily Wright – recording engineer (tracks 1–4, 8, 10, 12, Additional- 13), vocal editing (1–3, 7, 10, 12)

== Charts ==
=== Weekly charts ===
Weekly chart performance for Animal
Chart (2010–2011)	Peak position
Australian Albums (ARIA)	4
Austrian Albums (Ö3 Austria)	4
Belgian Albums (Ultratop Flanders)	32
Belgian Albums (Ultratop Wallonia)	22
Brazilian Albums (ABPD)	16
Canadian Albums (Billboard)	1
Croatian International Albums (HDU)	36
Dutch Albums (Album Top 100)	52
European Top 100 Albums (Billboard)	7
Finnish Albums (Suomen virallinen lista)	43
French Albums (SNEP)	11
German Albums (Offizielle Top 100)	7
Greek Albums (IFPI)	1
Hungarian Albums (MAHASZ)	38
Irish Albums (IRMA)	8
Italian Albums (FIMI)	22
Japanese Albums (Oricon)	3
Japanese Top Album Sales (Billboard)	4
Mexican Albums (AMPROFON)	27
New Zealand Albums (RMNZ)	6
Norwegian Albums (VG-lista)	36
Polish Albums (OLiS)	44
Scottish Albums (Official Charts)	7
South African Albums (RiSA)	15
South Korean Albums (Circle)	17
South Korean International Albums (Circle)	3
Spanish Albums (Promusicae)	62
Swiss Albums (Romandie)	4
Swiss Albums (Schweizer Hitparade)	3
Taiwan International Albums (G-Music)	2
UK Albums (Official Charts)	8
US Billboard 200	1
US Indie Store Album Sales (Billboard)	13

Chart (2026)	Peak position
US Top Dance Albums (Billboard)	2

=== Year-end charts ===
Year-end chart performance for Animal
Chart (2010)	Position
Australian Albums (ARIA)	11
Austrian Albums (Ö3 Austria) Animal + Cannibal	44
Canadian Albums (Billboard)	12
European Top 100 Albums (Billboard)	59
French Albums (SNEP)	88
German Albums (Offizielle Top 100)	91
Japanese Albums (Oricon)	61
Mexican Albums (AMPROFON)	68
New Zealand Albums (RMNZ) Animal + Cannibal	30
Swiss Albums (Schweizer Hitparade)	31
UK Albums (Official Charts)	84
US Billboard 200	20
US Digital Albums (Billboard)	6

Chart (2011)	Position
Australian Albums (ARIA)	55
US Billboard 200	95

=== Decade-end charts ===
Decade-end chart performance for Animal
Chart (2010–2019)	Position
Australian Albums (ARIA)	64
US Billboard 200	115

=== Animal + Cannibal ===
==== Weekly charts ====
Weekly chart performance for Animal + Cannibal
Chart (2010–2011)	Peak position
Austria (Ö3 Austria)	67
Greek Albums (IFPI)	35
Hungarian Albums (MAHASZ)	38
Irish Albums (IRMA)	17
New Zealand Albums (RMNZ)	22
South Korean Albums (Circle)	19
South Korean International Albums (Circle)	6
UK Albums (Official Charts)	22

==== Year-end charts ====
Year-end chart performance for Animal + Cannibal
Chart (2010)	Peak position
Austrian Albums (Ö3 Austria)	44
New Zealand Albums (RMNZ)	30

== Certifications ==
Certifications for Animal
Region	Certification	Certified units/sales
Australia (ARIA)	2× Platinum	140,000^{^}
Austria (IFPI Austria)	Gold	10,000^{*}
Canada (Music Canada)	2× Platinum	160,000^{^}
Denmark (IFPI Danmark)	Platinum	20,000^{‡}
France (SNEP)	Gold	50,000^{*}
Germany (BVMI)	Gold	100,000^{^}
Ireland (IRMA)	Gold	7,500^{^}
Italy (FIMI)	Gold	25,000^{‡}
Japan (RIAJ)	Gold	100,000^{^}
Mexico (AMPROFON)	Platinum	60,000^{^}
New Zealand (RMNZ)	3× Platinum	45,000^{‡}
Poland (ZPAV)	Gold	10,000^{*}
Sweden (GLF) for Animal + Cannibal	Gold	20,000^{‡}
United Kingdom (BPI)	Platinum	300,000^{‡}
United States (RIAA)	4× Platinum	4,000,000^{‡}
^{*} Sales figures based on certification alone.^{^} Shipments figures based on certification alone.^{‡} Sales+streaming figures based on certification alone.

== Release history ==
=== Animal ===
Animal release history
Region	Date	Label	Ref.
Denmark	January 1, 2010	Sony	
Italy	January 1, 2010	Sony	
Philippines	January 1, 2010	Sony	
South Korea	January 4, 2010	Sony	
Canada	January 5, 2010	Sony	
Spain	January 5, 2010	Sony	
United States	January 5, 2010	RCA	
Australia	January 8, 2010	Sony	
New Zealand	January 11, 2010	Sony	
France	January 25, 2010	Sony	
Brazil	January 28, 2010	Sony	
United Kingdom	February 1, 2010	Columbia	
Argentina	February 23, 2010	Sony	
Japan	May 12, 2010	Sony Japan	
Australia	July 16, 2010	Sony	

=== Animal + Cannibal ===
Animal + Cannibal release history
Region	Date	Version	Label	Ref.
Australia	November 19, 2010	Original	Sony	
Canada	November 22, 2010	Original	Sony	
New Zealand	November 22, 2010	Original	Sony	
Philippines	November 22, 2010	Original	Sony	
South Korea	November 22, 2010	Original	Sony	
United States	November 22, 2010	Original	RCA	
Japan	December 8, 2010	Original	Sony Japan	
Brazil	December 20, 2010	Original	Sony	
United Kingdom	January 31, 2011	Original	Columbia	
Various	November 21, 2025	15th Anniversary Edition	Sony	
