= Blow (Kesha song) =

2011 single by Kesha

Single by Kesha

from the EP Cannibal
- B-side: "Fuck Him He's a DJ"
- Released: February 1, 2011
- Recorded: 2010
- Studio: Conway Recording Studios (Los Angeles, CA)
- Genre: Electropop; dance-pop
- Length: 3:40
- Label: RCA
- Songwriters: Kesha Sebert; Klas Åhlund; Lukasz Gottwald; Allan Grigg; Benjamin Levin; Max Martin
- Producers: Dr. Luke; Max Martin; Benny Blanco; Kool Kojak

Kesha singles chronology
"We R Who We R" (2010)	"Blow" (2011)	"Die Young" (2012)

Music video
- "Blow" on YouTube

"Blow" is a song by American singer and songwriter Kesha from her first extended play (EP), Cannibal (2010). The song was released as a promotional single on November 12, 2010, and as an official single on February 1, 2011. It was written by Kesha, along with Klas Åhlund and the producers, Dr. Luke, Kool Kojak, Benny Blanco, and Max Martin. According to Kesha the song's lyrics are representative of herself and her fans. "Blow" is dominantly an electropop and dance-pop song and is described as a party anthem as it portrays a simple message of having a desire to have a good time at a club.

Critical reception of "Blow" has been generally positive, with most critics praising the song's hook, opening, and party anthem vibe, though some found the chorus uninspiring and ordinary. Kesha's vocal work throughout the song was met with mixed reaction: some critics felt that she was both sassy and brash, while other critics felt that her personality was missing from the song. Commercially, "Blow" reached the top ten in the Billboard Hot 100 in the United States and Australia, becoming her sixth consecutive top-ten hit in both countries as a solo artist. The song also reached the top ten in New Zealand, and the top 20 in Canadian Hot 100 in Canada. It has been certified 5× platinum by the Recording Industry Association of America (RIAA) for selling five million equivalent units in the United States.

The song's accompanying music video was directed by Chris Marrs Piliero and was released February 25, 2011. The video co-stars actor James Van Der Beek, who plays Kesha's nemesis. Piliero and Kesha came up with the video's concept and is intended to be simplistic, a video that is cool and random. Reception of the video by critics was positive, with the mid-video dialogue scene's humor being highlighted.

== Writing and composition ==
"Blow"
"Blow" is an electropop and dance-pop song that uses a synth-infused beat. Kesha repeats "This place about to blow" four times in an auto-tuned "stuttering" vocal style.

"Blow" was written by Kesha alongside Klas Åhlund, Lukasz Gottwald, Alan Grigg, Benjamin Levin and Max Martin. Production of the song was completed by Dr. Luke, Max Martin, Benny Blanco and Kool Kojak. According to Kesha the line "We're taking over" is representative of herself and her fans, which she explained during an interview with Beatweek Magazine, "I love that I say 'we're taking over' in it because my fans and me have started a cult. We're misfits of society but we've banded together and we're starting a revolution. We are taking over. So get used to it."

"Blow" is an electropop and dance-pop song that uses a synth infused beat as a backing. The song opens with laughing followed by a command to dance. As the chorus of the song starts in, Kesha's vocals change into an auto-tuned "stuttering" as she repeats "This place about to blow" four times over an electro beat. During the song's bridge, Kesha's vocals change pace into a rap-sing style as she tells her listeners to "Go insane, go insane / Throw some glitter / Make it rain on 'em / Let me see them Hanes." Kesha uses layered vocals that are enhanced in some parts with the use of Auto-Tune. Lyrically, "Blow" portrays a simple message, described as a party-anthem, the song speaks of having a desire to have a good time at the club. According to Robert Copsey from Digital Spy, the track is of similar character to Benny Benassi's track, "Satisfaction" (2002).

The song is performed in the key of B minor with a tempo of 120 beats per minute.

== Reception ==
=== Critical response ===
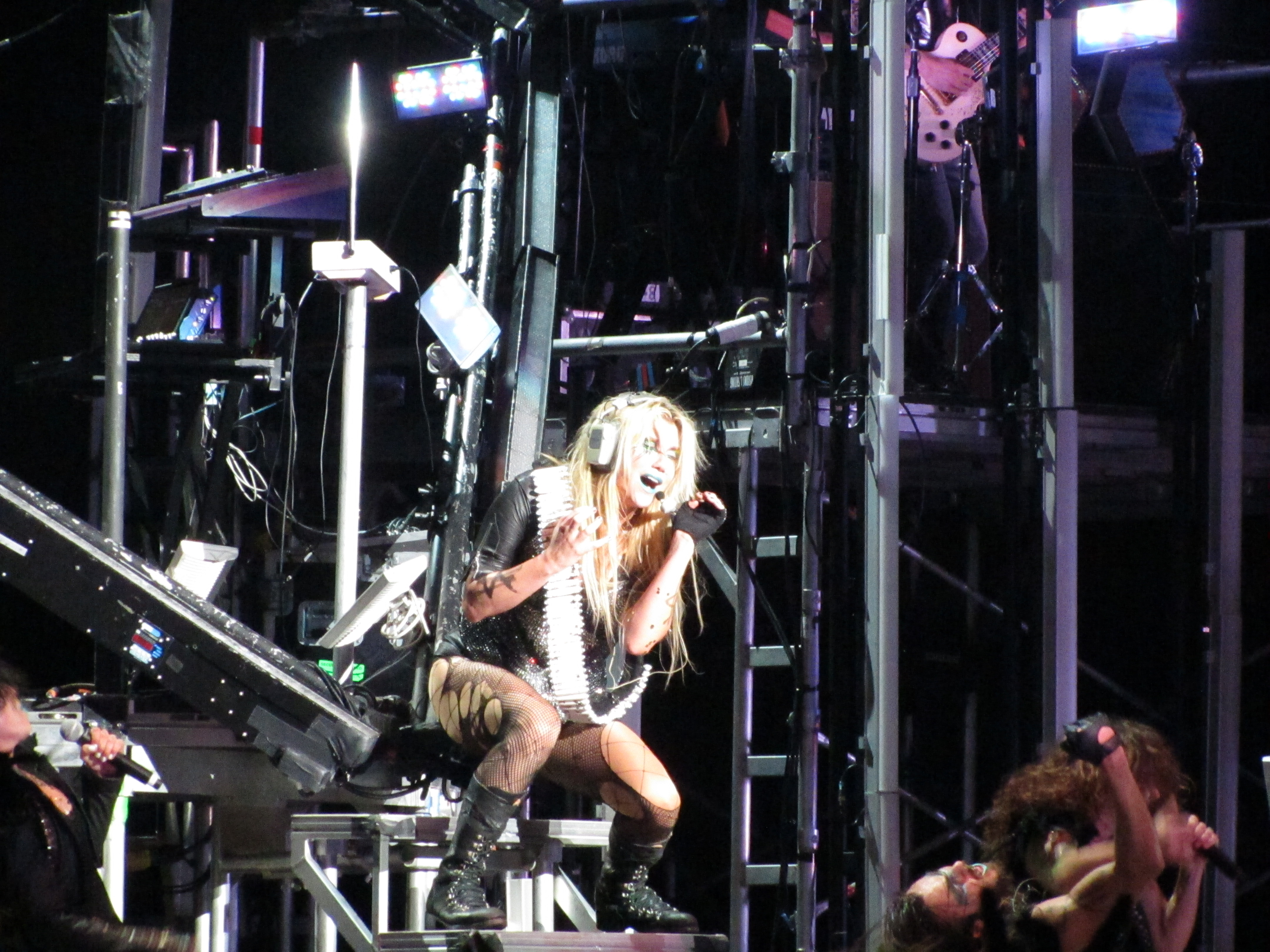
Kesha performing "Blow" on the Get Sleazy Tour

While reviewing Cannibal, Sal Cinquemani from Slant Magazine positively wrote that "Blow" was an undeniable "stuttery club track". Daniel Brockman from The Phoenix wrote that the song was a "club banger" and that Kesha portrayed a bratty and cultural irritant attitude throughout the song referencing to the line, "We are taking over — get used to it!" Brockman commented that the song "sends a shiver down your spine" further complimenting the production of Dr. Luke. Jocelyn Vena from MTV News wrote that the song featured common Kesha elements citing her carpe diem attitude and grinding beats but noted that the lyrics also portrayed a darker side of Kesha, referring to the line, "We get what we want/ We do what you don't." Vena also wrote that the song contained a "scream-along party-anthem chorus". Scott Shetler from AOL Radio felt that Kesha's lyrical delivery was both sassy and brash. In a separate review from AOL Radio, the song was ranked at position nine on the website's list of "10 Best Songs of 2011". The review concluded that Kesha's strongest songwriting skills pertained to party anthems. The review compared the song to previous singles, "Tik Tok" and "We R Who We R".

Robert Copsey from Digital Spy gave the single five out of a possible five stars. Copsey felt that the song was representative of Kesha, writing the track "sums up everything [Kesha] – for all her scrubbiness, Auto-Tuning and boozy antics – is all about." The song's chorus was praised in the review with Copsey writing that the song contained a "hooky, robotic and all-round stonkingly huge chorus." Copsey concluded his review on the song writing that "Blow" was the "Jägermeister of pop singles: sweet, potent and guaranteed to leave you buzzing for hours after." The A.V. Club editors Steven Hyden and Genevieve Koski were positive of the song, giving it a B and a B+, respectively, with Hyden complimenting its "top-notch bubblegum production" while noting that it was more "safe" than many of Kesha's other hits. Koski, on the other hand, said that, due to the song's "big, bold, and bumping production," it allowed her to overlook Kesha's usual "trashiness."

== Commercial performance ==
"Blow" was originally released exclusively to the iTunes Store as part of a "Countdown to Cannibal" promotion, and thus originally entered the Billboard Hot 100 on the issue date titled December 4, 2010, reaching position 97 and dropping off the chart the following week. After being released as a single, the song re-entered the chart on the issue date titled February 12, 2011, reaching a new peak of 96. The following week the song jumped 30 positions reaching position 66. The song continued to steadily ascend the charts eventually reaching a peak of seven on the week of March 19, 2011. On the song's peak week it sold 164,000 digital copies and was listed at position six on Billboard's Hot Digital Songs. Charting within the top ten, the song became Kesha's sixth straight top ten single as a solo artist. On Billboard's Pop chart, the song reached a peak of number three. In 2011, the song had passed two million in digital sales, becoming her sixth consecutive single to sell more than two million digital copies. As of June 2016, "Blow" has sold 3.4 million digital copies in the United States. In 2024, the song has been certified 5× Platinum by the Recording Industry Association of America (RIAA) for selling 5 million equivalent units in the United States.

In Canada, "Blow" entered the Canadian Hot 100 on the issue date February 5, 2011, at 100. The following week the song jumped 31 positions to attain position 69. On its third week "Blow" once again rose this time to position 54. The song continued to steadily ascend the chart eventually reaching a peak of 12. In New Zealand, "Blow" entered the charts at position 20 where it became that week's highest debut. The following week it rose nine positions attaining position 11. On the song's third week on the chart "Blow" reached its peak at number eight. The song became her second straight top ten hit and her fourth overall. It has since been certified gold by the Recording Industry Association of New Zealand (RIANZ) for sales of 7,500 units. On February 27, 2011, "Blow" entered the Australian chart at position 24. On the issue date of March 13, 2011, the song reached position 13, where it held the spot for two weeks. The following week the song reached its peak at position 10, becoming her sixth straight top ten single, but her first to miss the top five. It has since been certified platinum by the Australian Recording Industry Association (ARIA) for sales of 70,000 units. In the United Kingdom, "Blow" entered the UK Singles Chart on the week of April 2, 2011, at position 80, later peaking at number 32.

== Music video ==
=== Background ===
"I think the more you try to come up with a logical explanation for it, the more frustrated you’re gonna get. Just kick back and enjoy. The credit for anything you like about the video has to go to the director, Chris Marrs [Piliero]. He came up with the concept, wrote the dialogue, shot it…"

— James Van Der Beek's take on the video's concept.

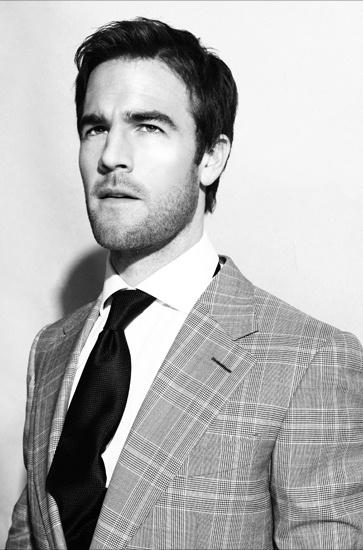
James Van Der Beek (pictured) plays Kesha's nemesis in the music video.

The music video for "Blow" was directed by Chris Marrs Piliero. The video was released on February 25, 2011. Kesha wanted the video to be "different, a video that was cool and random". The director, Piliero, came up with the idea for the video's mythological aspect saying, "I had this idea running in my head with just the idea of unicorns, If I massacred unicorns, they could bleed rainbows. I'm a fan of violence and I'm always trying to find a way to make it OK." While being interviewed Piliero spoke of the collaboration with Kesha, explaining her point of view on the video, "Before we started filming, we had quite a few talks. She was adamant you can't back away from the crazy; everything about the idea she loved and she enforced the fact that she wanted to embrace every aspect of it and really go for it, On set, she was having fun. She was like, 'I want to lick a unicorn.' It was rad working with her because there definitely wasn't a sense of her feeling awkward about stuff or detached; no ego. It felt like we had worked together before."

=== Synopsis ===
A still from the music video showing Kesha as she shoots at Van der Beek while hiding behind a unicorn-headed party guest. Amongst the background, other unicorn-headed guests can be seen being killed from stray gun shots.

Opening with the disclaimer "No mythological creatures were harmed in the making of this video", Kesha appears sitting next to two unicorns pouring champagne while having a conversation on how she was elected to the parliament of Uzbekistan, "So I grabbed the bear by the throat and I looked him right in the eyes, and I said, 'Bear, you have till the count of zero to put some pants on and apologize to the president.'" The music begins and Kesha makes eyes at James Van Der Beek. After the eye contact Kesha grabs one of the unicorns and kisses him then removes her bra and throws it across the room, Van Der Beek then does the same with his bra, puzzling Kesha as to why he was wearing a bra. The music fades in the background as the two then make their way to the center of the dance floor and exchange words ("Well, well, well. If it isn’t James Van Der Douche.", "I don't appreciate you slander-Beeking my name, Ke dollar sign ha.") before engaging in a gun fight. They begin shooting lasers at one another, killing multiple unicorns. Van Der Beek gets hit in the shoulder and falls. As Kesha steps on his arm to stop him from reaching for his gun, he begs for a truce before she goes in for the kill. At the end of the video, it is revealed that Van Der Beek's head has been mounted on a wall over a plaque reading, "James Van Der Dead", as she sits with two unicorns laughing at their trophy. She then frowns at the camera and it switches to Van Der Beek's head one more time before the screen goes black.

=== Reception ===
Willa Paskin from New York Magazine opened her review of the video writing, "Maybe it's exhaustion, maybe it's acquiescence, maybe it's just time, but Ke$ha and her whole glam-wasted shtick are starting to charm us." Paskin felt that Kesha had a great "functioning sense of humor" writing that she "enjoyed her new video". Peter Gaston from Spin, referring to Kesha, wrote that he was able to "continually find something massively entertaining about this tartlet" and wrote that the video was "provocative". Rolling Stone's Matthew Perpetua wrote "You know you're in for a great video when the very first thing you see is a disclaimer reading "No mythological creatures were harmed in the making of this video." Perpetua wrote that "Blow" had it all, from unicorns to James Van der Beek and laser gun battles. Becky Bain of Idolator said the video included "the best mid-video dialogue scene in all of music video history."

== Promotion ==
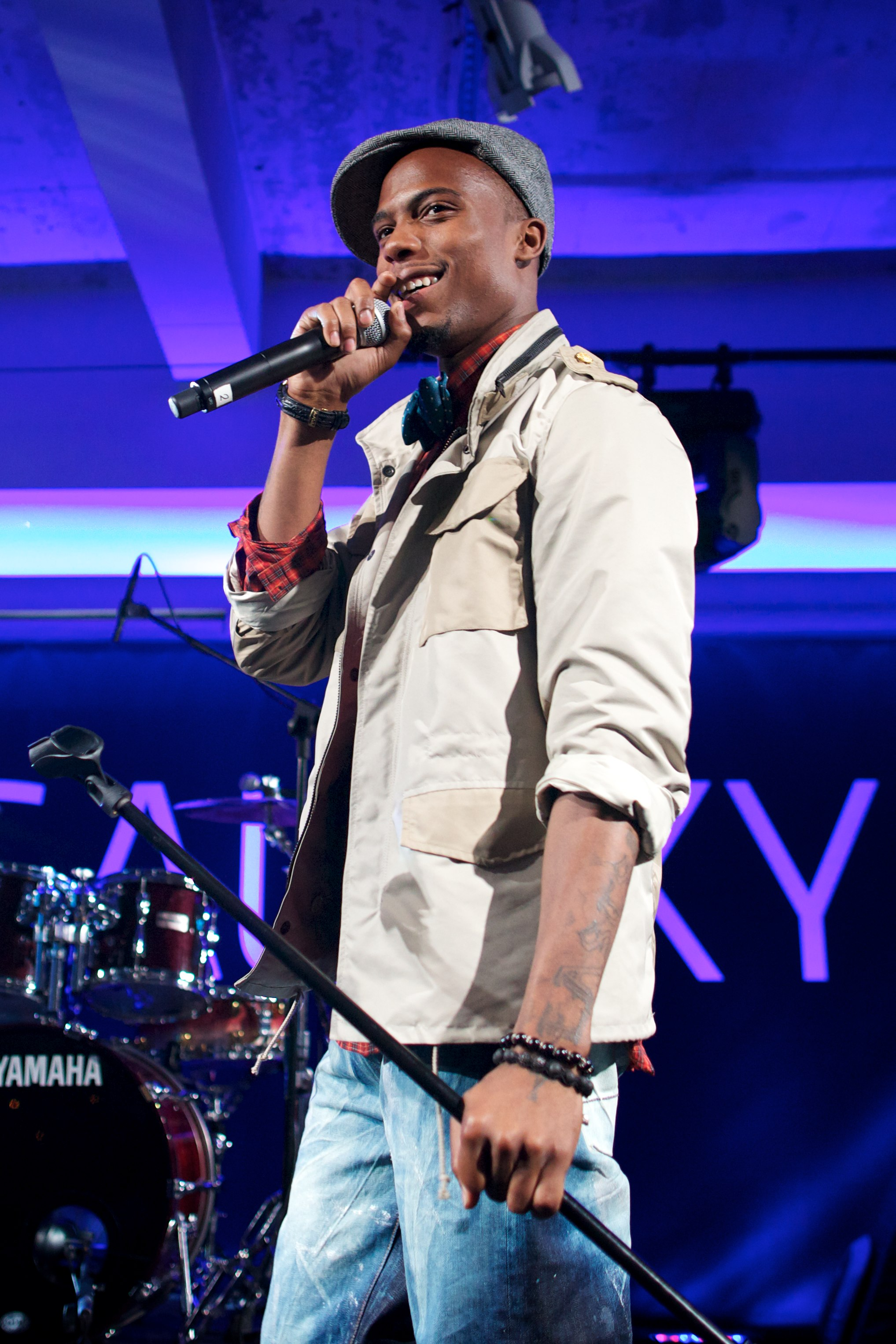
Rapper B.o.B is featured on an official remix of the song.

"Blow" was performed on television for the first time on April 22, 2011, for the Nickelodeon show Victorious episode "Ice Cream for Ke$ha." The storyline for the episode saw the show's stars competing in a contest to win a private concert by Kesha. In order to win the contest the cast had to spell out Kesha's name through letters found at the bottom of ice cream containers. Kesha's younger brother, Louie Sebert also guest starred in the episode. "Blow" was performed live on May 22, 2011, at the 2011 Billboard Music Awards. The performance was opened with "Animal" as Kesha sang suspended over the stage in a structure shaped like a diamond. Midway through the performance she dropped backwards into her crowd of background dancers then transitioned into "Blow". The performance featured glitter cannons and the dancers wore orange unicorn heads. It was also used in an advertisement for the then-upcoming season of The Real World: Las Vegas on MTV.

American rapper B.o.B is featured on an official remix of "Blow" that was released to iTunes on May 17, 2011. B.o.B opens the track with a minute-long rapped verse about himself then adds to the song's dominant party theme, rapping: "Night starts out at the ATM / It probably won’t end til 8 am." Following this verse Kesha proclaims "We are taking over", before the track resumes as it normally would without B.o.B's addition. Scott Shetler from PopCrush criticized the remix for not technically being a remix, rather being just the original song with added verses. Shetler wrote "the term 'remix' makes us imagine all the ways the song could be creatively re-arranged. And a fun song like ‘Blow,’ with its brash lyrics and skittering beat, holds endless remix possibilities. But this version doesn't substantially improve the original." He went on to give the song three and a half stars out of a possible five.

== Formats and track listings ==
- Digital download
1. "Blow" – 3:40
- German CD
1. "Blow" – 3:40
2. "The Sleazy Remix" (featuring André 3000) – 3:48
- UK digital EP
1. "Blow" – 3:40
2. "Fuck Him He's a DJ" – 3:40
3. "Blow" (Cirkut remix) – 4:05
4. "Animal" (Switch remix) – 4:46
- Digital download (remix)
1. "Blow" (remix; featuring B.o.B) – 4:31

== Credits and personnel ==
- Background vocals – Kesha
- Lead vocals – Kesha
- Songwriting – Kesha Sebert, Klas Åhlund, Lukasz Gottwald, Alan Grigg, Benjamin Levin, Max Martin
- Production – Dr. Luke, Max Martin, Benny Blanco, Kool Kojak
- Instruments and programming – Dr. Luke, Max Martin, Benny Blanco, Kool Kojak
- Engineering – Emily Wright, Sam Holland, Chris "TEK" O'Ryan

Credits adapted from the liner notes of Cannibal, Dynamite Cop Music/Where Da Kasz At BMI.

== Charts ==
=== Weekly charts ===
Weekly chart performance for "Blow"
Chart (2011)	Peak position
Australia (ARIA)	10
Austria (Ö3 Austria Top 40)	22
Belgium (Ultratip Bubbling Under Flanders)	4
Belgium (Ultratip Bubbling Under Wallonia)	6
Canada Hot 100 (Billboard)	12
Canada CHR/Top 40 (Billboard)	9
Canada Hot AC (Billboard)	21
CIS Airplay (TopHit)	102
Czech Republic Airplay (ČNS IFPI)	36
Germany (GfK)	39
Global Dance Songs (Billboard)	22
Hungary (Editors' Choice Top 40)	15
Ireland (IRMA)	28
Israel (Media Forest TV Airplay)	1
Japan Hot 100 (Billboard)	96
Lithuania (European Hit Radio)	14
Netherlands (Dutch Tipparade)	1
New Zealand (Recorded Music NZ)	8
Russia Airplay (TopHit)	93
Scottish Singles Sales (Official Charts)	26
Slovakia Airplay (ČNS IFPI)	7
South Korea Foreign (Circle)	35
South Korea Foreign Downloads (Circle)	28
UK Singles (Official Charts)	32
US Billboard Hot 100	7
US Adult Pop Airplay (Billboard)	26
US Dance Club Songs (Billboard)	27
US Pop Airplay (Billboard)	3
US Rhythmic Airplay (Billboard)	22

=== Year-end charts ===
Year-end chart performance for "Blow"
Chart (2011)	Position
Australia (ARIA)	77
Canada Hot 100 (Billboard)	57
Hungary (Editors' Choice Top 40)	94
US Billboard Hot 100	33
US Pop Airplay (Billboard)	27
US Radio Songs (Billboard)	45

== Certifications ==
Certifications for "Blow"
Region	Certification	Certified units/sales
Australia (ARIA)	2× Platinum	140,000^{‡}
New Zealand (RMNZ)	Platinum	30,000^{‡}
United Kingdom (BPI)	Gold	400,000^{‡}
United States (RIAA)	5× Platinum	5,000,000^{‡}
^{‡} Sales+streaming figures based on certification alone.

== Release history ==
Release history dates and formats for "Blow"
Region	Date	Format(s)	Version(s)	Label(s)	Ref.
Switzerland	November 12, 2010	Digital download	Original	RCA	
United States	November 12, 2010	Digital download	Original	RCA	
United States	February 1, 2011	Contemporary hit radio; rhythmic contemporary radio	Original	Kemosabe; RCA	
Italy	February 11, 2011	Radio airplay	Original	Sony	
Germany	April 22, 2011	CD	Original	Kemosabe; RCA	
United Kingdom	April 22, 2011	Digital download	Original; Cirkut remix	RCA	
United States	May 17, 2011	Digital download	Remix featuring B.o.B	RCA	

== See also ==
- List of Billboard Hot 100 top-ten singles in 2011
- List of top 10 singles for 2011 in Australia
