= Take It Off (Kesha song) =

2010 single by Kesha

Single by Kesha

from the album Animal
- Released: July 13, 2010
- Recorded: April 2009
- Studio: Conway Recording Studios, Los Angeles, California
- Genre: Electropop; dance-pop; electro house
- Length: 3:35
- Label: RCA
- Songwriters: Kesha Sebert; Lukasz Gottwald; Claude Kelly
- Producer: Dr. Luke

Kesha singles chronology
"Your Love Is My Drug" (2010)	"Take It Off" (2010)	"We R Who We R" (2010)

Music videos
- "Take It Off" on YouTube; "Take It Off" (K$ n' Friends version) on YouTube

"Take It Off" is a song by American singer and songwriter Kesha, from her debut studio album, Animal (2010). It was written by Kesha Sebert, Lukasz Gottwald and Claude Kelly and it was produced by Dr. Luke with vocal editing done by Emily Wright. It was released as the fourth single from the album on July 13, 2010. The song's initial lyrics consisted of Kesha attending a drag show and becoming turned on by drag queens taking their clothing off. The song is an upbeat song that uses heavy amounts of auto tune and utilizes an electro infused beat, driven by a melody known as the Arabian riff.

Due to strong digital sales from the release of Animal, the song charted on the United States Billboard Hot 100, the United Kingdom Singles Chart and the Canadian Hot 100 before being announced as a single. After being released as a single, the song reached the top ten in Canada, Australia and the United States, and reached number one on Hungarian radio. With the song reaching the top-ten in the United States, Kesha became only the eleventh artist in history to amass four top-tens from a debut album. "Take It Off" was certified 4× platinum by the Recording Industry Association of America (RIAA) for selling four million equivalent units in the United States.

Two music videos for the single were released. The first video features Kesha and her friends on a distant planet, dancing around in a mosh pit while slowly turning into stardust as the video progresses. The inspiration for the video, according to Kesha, was about shedding your inhibitions and being "raw and real". The second video released for the song features Jeffree Star and incorporates a more dominant animal theme, while drawing from 1980s themed inspiration such as: the 1982 film Tron, David Bowie as Jareth in the 1986 film Labyrinth, and the 1984 film Revenge of the Nerds. To promote the single Kesha performed "Take It Off" alongside earlier singles "Your Love Is My Drug" and "Tik Tok" on NBC's Today.

== Writing and inspiration ==
"Take It Off" was written by Kesha, alongside Dr. Luke and Claude Kelly. It was recorded at Conway Recording Studios in Los Angeles, California, and at Dr. Luke's studio in that city. The song was produced by Luke with vocal editing done by Emily Wright. The main riff of the chorus is the same as that of "The Streets of Cairo", also using a similar rhyme scheme and parallel phrasing. During an interview with Esquire magazine Kesha was asked about her song writing process and used "Take It Off" as an example of how her songs come to fruition. She explained that the song came about when she was out one night and was visiting a drag bar, stating, "I have a song ... called 'Take It Off' about when I went to a drag show, and how really turned on I was by these transvestite men taking clothes off. I was like, What does that even make me?".

== Composition ==
"Take It Off"
"Take It Off" is an upbeat dominant song that uses an electro-infused beat with furious crescendos

"Take It Off" is an upbeat dominant song that utilizes a "thumping, electro-infused beat with furious crescendos." Dr. Luke's production has been described as a "bubblegummy electro" number that uses a nursery rhyme hook in its delivery. Kesha's vocals on the song were noted for their heavy amounts of Auto-Tune. Daniel Brockman from The Phoenix described the song as "a heavily Auto-Tuned reworking" of "There's a Place in France". Monica Herrera from Billboard, however, felt that the song "lifted heavily from Robert Miles' 1995 trance-lite hit, "Children". Lyrically, "Take It Off" discusses opposite-sex objectification and its theme is literal to the title.

According to sheet music published at Musicnotes.com by Kobalt Music Publishing, the song is written in common time with a moderate beat rate of 125 beats per minute. The song is written in the key of F minor and has the sequence of D♭–E♭–Fm as the chord progression. Kesha's vocal range in the song spans from the note of F_{3} to the note of C_{5}. Music reviewer Bill Lamb commented on the lyrical writing of the song noting that the lyrics were symbolic, stating, "[the song] manages to expand out into an anthem about free expression ... [a] celebration of the power of the night, and a bit of alcohol, to help shed inhibitions of the daytime." Lamb further commented that the lyrics drew similar reference to that of Lady Gaga's commenting, "followers of Lady Gaga's Monster Ball Tour will be familiar with this point of view [about free expression]."

== Critical reception ==
Amar Toor from AOL Radio gave the song a positive review saying, "Much like the rest of the album, this new song is simply made for the dance floor. And, much like Kesha herself, the track seems to embody relentless, carefree hedonism at its best." He also noted, "And when Kesha talks about a 'place I know', where 'they go hardcore and there's glitter on the floor' in the style of a six-grade camp ditty, it's hard for anyone to not feel the urge to just take it off." Bill Lamb of About.com gave the single four out of five stars. He was concerned with the overall lyrical depth and over-use of Auto-Tune but he complimented the song for its "irresistibly catchy beat and chorus" with a "celebratory mood of dropping inhibitions." He noted that "with the volume turned up and the chorus encouraging you to 'take it off,' you may just feel inspired to follow the commands. The ultimate effect by the end of the song is very cathartic as it hints strongly that there is more to "take off" than simply clothing." Andrew Burgess from MusicOMH wrote that on the song the singer "oozes swagger." Melinda Newman of HitFix used "Take It Off" as an example of Kesha's songwriting, noting that tracks which weren't over-thought were "fine". Newman wrote that "thinking too much is what gets Kesha, who co-wrote the songs here, in trouble. She’s fine wading in the shallow end with bouncy tunes like the literal 'Take It Off'."

Monica Herrera from Billboard magazine criticized the song for its demonstration of overly processed vocals noting how easily an artist can "get lost in a sea of auto-tone". She went on to state that it "make[s] it hard to tell whether the California party girl can actually sing". Robert Copsey of Digital Spy met the song with a mixed review. He commented on the choice of the single, noting "the glimpses of emotion shown on her last offering, 'Your Love Is My Drug', are as long gone as her sobriety." Although he was not completely convinced he wrote, "[though] the vocals are more processed than a cheese string ... the combination of a playful nursery rhyme hook and Dr Luke's bubblegummy electro production make this a pretty irresistible little dancefloor ditty." He went on to give the single three out of five stars. Fraser McAlpine of BBC met the song with a mixed review giving the song three out of five stars. Fraser criticized the choice of the song commenting, "there's a fear that if Kesha reveals that she's a sensitive young flower after all, with real feelings and a good, pure heart, her appeal with disappear like a soap bubble on a cactus, can it?". Nate Adams of No Ripcord was negative in his review of the song, calling it "outright stupid" and noted it would be something commonly heard on a playground. Adams wrote that the song touched on opposite-sex objectification, but wrote that the theme became wearisome on the album, using the song as one of the examples where the theme was overused.

== Commercial performance ==
In January 2010, due to strong digital sales, the song charted on the Billboard Hot 100, the United Kingdom Singles Chart and the Canadian Hot 100, debuting at numbers 85, 45, and 112 respectively. In the United States, the song re-entered the Billboard Hot 100 at number 92 on the issue date of August 7, 2010. The song steadily ascended the charts for six weeks before eventually reaching a peak of eight on its eighth week on the chart. With the song charting in the top-ten it became Kesha's fourth consecutive top-ten single and she became the 11th female artist in history to attain four top-ten singles off of a debut album. In September 2010, the song reached 1 million downloads, making Kesha the second lead artist, following Lady Gaga, to achieve four million selling songs in 2010. The song later crossed the two million paid downloads mark in February 2011, becoming her fifth song to do so. As of March 2016, "Take it Off" has sold 2.5 million digital copies. In 2024, the song received a 4× Platinum certification by the Recording Industry Association of America (RIAA) for sales of 4 million equivalent units.

In Canada, following its debut on the chart from her album Animal's release, the song ascended and descended the chart for 12 weeks before eventually dropping off the chart. On July 13, 2010, the song re-entered the chart at 86. After ascending the chart for seven weeks the single reached an eventual peak of eight. In the United Kingdom, the song was listed on the UK Singles Chart for one week, dropping off the following week. On the issue date of August 28, 2010 the single re-entered the chart at 44. After steadily ascending the charts, the song eventually reached a peak of 15. In New Zealand, "Take It Off" entered the Official Top 40 Singles chart at 32 on the issue date of July 12, 2010. In the succeeding week the single rose ten spots to attain position 22. As of 2024, the song has since received a Platinum certification by Recorded Music NZ (RMNZ), for sales and streaming equivalent-units of 30,000 in the country. After eight more weeks of steadily ascending the charts, the single reached a peak of 11 on its tenth total week on the chart. On August 22, 2010, the single entered the Australian Singles Chart at 29. The song ascended the chart for three weeks eventually reaching a peak of five. It has since been certified triple Platinum by the Australian Recording Industry Association (ARIA) for sales of 210,000 units.

== Music videos ==
=== First version ===
A still of the music video that shows Kesha "unzipping" herself, transforming into stardust. The scene is intended to be symbolic with the transformation representing letting go of one's inhibitions.

The original video for "Take It Off" premiered on Vevo on August 3, 2010. It was directed by Paul Hunter and Dori Oskowitz. Kesha revealed the main idea behind the video in an interview explaining that "[the video was] about [her] and all [her] hot vampire babe friends breaking into a hotel on another planet, and at the end we all turn into this beautiful stardust. Once you take it all off, all your inhibitions, your clothes, we're all made up of the same thing." She explained that she did not want the video to just be about "Taking it off", that the message behind the video and the theme wasn't "just about taking off your clothes and rolling in glitter. It's also about taking off your inhibitions and being raw and real".

The video starts off with Kesha seen on a motorcycle. She proceeds to walk as her friends follow behind her as they enter a motel area. As the chorus of the song starts, Kesha and her friends start to run around the motel dancing and jumping off railings. The friends gather around an empty pool and start tearing at each other's clothing; While this is happening it is revealed they that are on a different planet and Kesha is seen rolling around in sand. Slowly as some of the friends start taking off their clothing, they begin to turn into star dust. The group starts to dance in the pool with some of the party goers exploding into dust. The remainder of the friends continue to dance in the dust that is now covering the bottom of the pool. As this is happening they all begin to lose different parts of their bodies as they explode into multicolored star dust. The video ends with everyone as dust with Kesha beginning to "unzip" herself as she turns into yellow dust.

Jocelyn Vena of MTV News met the video with a positive review. She noted that Kesha "manages to embrace her inner party animal and throw a neo-colored party at an abandoned motel in the middle of nowhere." She stated that "While the concept of "a lot of pretty people dancing at dusk" is pretty simple, the neo colors manage to amp up the video, as does the colored sand that's thrown around in the air and mixed with glitter." Her conclusion of the video and of Kesha was that as simple as it may be, "she manages to be both sexy and fun while rolling around in the desert." Melinda Newman of HitFix criticized the video's first half, calling it "predictable." The video's second half, however, was met with praise with Newman commenting that the 'special effects at the end almost redeem it."

=== Second version ===
Kesha deflecting a laser beam shot from Star in the music video's choreographed dance battle sequence. The video was inspired by films from the 1980s.

The song's second video was released via Kesha's YouTube account. She revealed the video's completion, release and inspiration through a video description quote saying, "heyy to all my fans! so me [and] my friends were bored and we were really channeling some 80's [inspiration] (Tron, David Bowie in Labyrinth, and Revenge of the Nerds.) and we made this new video for take it off. it was really fun to make. i hope you guys like it". The video was directed by Skinny. This version of the video is known as "Take it Off (K$ N' Friends Version)".

The video begins with a scene of a leopard with glowing blue eyes (later revealed to be Kesha) walking down an alleyway. The song's title flashes on the screen and the video pans to Kesha. She walks down the alleyway with two men who grab another man. Kesha spray-paints a dollar sign on his chest. They come to a party where she and her friends flash their tattooed dollar signs on their wrists and forearms in order to enter. As they enter, everyone starts dancing and the party-goers' faces are shown changing into different animals'. In the following scene, Kesha is seen sitting on a chair with two men by her side. Jeffree Star then approaches Kesha. Kesha and Star engage in a choreographed dance battle; Star then shoots Kesha with a laser chain saw which she deflects with her bracelet, Kesha responds by shooting lasers out of her hands, killing Star. After the battle the party-goers crawl around Kesha and she is seen holding a gold cup with a blue foaming liquid spilling over the top of the glass. As Kesha gives the party goers a drink, their faces turn into different kinds of animals. The video ends with everyone dancing and turning into half animal humans, Kesha however, drinks from the cup and turns back into a leopard.

== Live performances ==
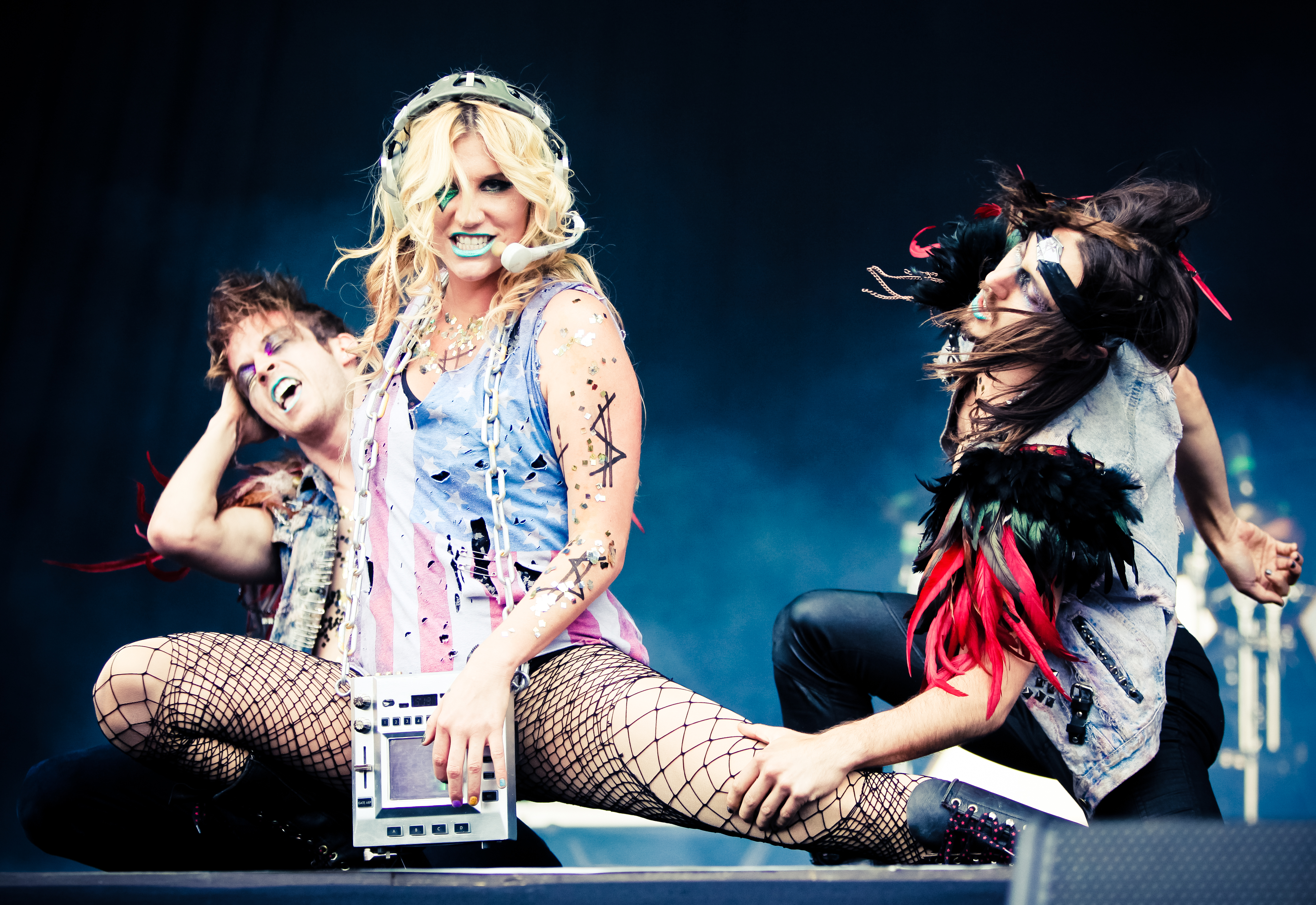
Kesha performing "Take It Off" on the Get Sleazy Tour

On August 13, 2010, Kesha performed "Take It Off" alongside earlier singles "Your Love Is My Drug" and "Tik Tok" on Today. In the performance, she is seen wearing boots, fishnets, glitter shorts and a loose tank top. By the second verse, her dancers, that are dressed in black start to undress as the chorus starts, revealing gold shirts and tank-tops. The performance featured smoke machines with Kesha playing notes on an electric keyboard while crawling on the floor. She has also performed the song in a set for BBC Radio 1's Big Weekend. "Take It Off" was performed on November 21, 2010, at the 2010 American Music Awards. The performance started off with Kesha opening with "Take It Off" while playing on the keyboard wearing a glowing robot helmet; she soon transitioned into "We R Who We R". Kesha also performed the song during her first concert tour, titled Get Sleazy Tour. The song was performed right after the concert opening track, "Sleazy".

== Credits and personnel ==
Recording

- Conway Recording Studios, Los Angeles, California, and at Dr. Luke's studio, Los Angeles, California.

Personnel

- Songwriting – Kesha Sebert, Lukasz Gottwald, Claude Kelly
- Production – Dr. Luke
- Production coordination – Vanessa Silberman, Megan Dennis, Becky Scott
- Instruments and programming – Dr. Luke
- Vocal Editing – Emily Wright
- Background Vocals – Claude Kelly, Aniela Gottwald, Tatiana Gottwald, Lukasz Gottwald, Graham Bryce
- Engineering – Emily Wright, Sam Holland

Credits adapted from the liner notes of Animal, Kemosabe Records, RCA Records.

== Charts ==
=== Weekly charts ===
Weekly chart performance for "Take It Off"
Chart (2010–11)	Peak position
Australia (ARIA)	5
Belgium (Ultratop 50 Flanders)	22
Belgium (Ultratip Bubbling Under Wallonia)	22
Canada Hot 100 (Billboard)	8
Canada CHR/Top 40 (Billboard)	8
Canada Hot AC (Billboard)	19
CIS Airplay (TopHit)	175
Czech Republic Airplay (ČNS IFPI)	6
Denmark (Tracklisten)	35
Europe (Billboard Euro Digital Songs)	19
Global Dance Songs (Billboard)	21
Hungary (Rádiós Top 40)	1
Ireland (IRMA)	12
Japan Hot 100 (Billboard)	81
Lithuania (European Hit Radio)	52
Mexico Ingles Airplay (Billboard)	8
Netherlands (Dutch Top 40)	21
Netherlands (Single Top 100)	44
New Zealand (Recorded Music NZ)	11
Russia Airplay (TopHit)	181
Scottish Singles Sales (Official Charts)	12
Slovakia Airplay (ČNS IFPI)	10
South Korea Foreign (Gaon)	42
South Korea Foreign Downloads (Gaon)	10
Spain (Promusicae)	37
Spain Airplay Chart (PROMUSICAE)	16
Sweden (Sverigetopplistan)	53
UK Singles (Official Charts)	15
US Billboard Hot 100	8
US Adult Pop Airplay (Billboard)	29
US Dance Club Songs (Billboard)	29
US Dance Airplay (Billboard)	14
US Pop Airplay (Billboard)	6
US Rhythmic Airplay (Billboard)	22

=== Year-end charts ===
Year-end chart performance for "Take It Off"
Chart (2010)	Position
Australia (ARIA)	45
Belgium (Ultratop 50 Flanders)	98
Brazil (Crowley)	84
Canada Hot 100 (Billboard)	48
Hungary (Rádiós Top 100)	54
South Korea Foreign (Gaon)	162
South Korea Foreign Downloads (Gaon)	149
UK Singles (Official Charts)	133
US Billboard Hot 100	59
US Pop Airplay (Billboard)	36

== Certifications and sales ==
Certifications and sales for "Take It Off"
Region	Certification	Certified units/sales
Australia (ARIA)	3× Platinum	210,000^{‡}
New Zealand (RMNZ)	Platinum	30,000^{‡}
South Korea	—	89,847
Sweden (GLF)	Gold	20,000^{‡}
United Kingdom (BPI)	Gold	400,000^{‡}
United States (RIAA)	4× Platinum	4,000,000^{‡}
^{‡} Sales+streaming figures based on certification alone.

== Release history ==
Release dates for "Take It Off"
Region	Date	Format	Label(s)	Ref.
United States	July 13, 2010	Contemporary hit radio	RCA; RMG	
Australia	July 19, 2010	Contemporary hit radio	Sony	
United States	August 3, 2010	Rhythmic contemporary radio	RCA; RMG	
Italy	September 3, 2010	Radio airplay	Sony	
United States	September 20, 2010	Hot adult contemporary radio	RCA; RMG	
