= Sleazy (song) =

Promotional single by Kesha

from the EP Cannibal
- A-side: "We R Who We R"
- Released: October 29, 2010
- Studio: Conway Recording Studios (Los Angeles, CA)
- Genre: Electro-hop; hip hop
- Length: 3:25
- Label: RCA
- Songwriters: Kesha Sebert; Lukasz Gottwald; Benjamin Levin; Shondrae Crawford; Klas Åhlund
- Producers: Bangladesh; Dr. Luke; Benny Blanco

"Sleazy" is a song by American singer and songwriter Kesha, taken from her first extended play (EP), Cannibal (2010). The song was written by Kesha alongside Lukasz "Dr. Luke" Gottwald, Benjamin Levin, Shondrae "Bangladesh" Crawford, and Klas Åhlund, with production done by Bangladesh, Dr. Luke and Levin. While working on the album she enlisted the help of producer Bangladesh so that she could give her music a more distinct edge. Kesha uses a "sing-rap" vocal style throughout the song and uses layered vocals that are enhanced in some parts with the use of auto-tune. Lyrically the song speaks of wealthy men hitting on Kesha, trying to buy her attention.

The song was covered by Ben Folds and Ben Folds Five as part of the 2011 compilation album The Best Imitation of Myself: A Retrospective. The song was later re-released featuring rapper André 3000. The collaboration came about after Kesha sent him a copy of the track in hopes that he would like it; they later spoke on the phone and André agreed to appear on the track. André's verse speaks about a young child dealing with his deadbeat father and also his friendship with Kesha.

Critical reception of the song was generally positive with critics citing the song as a strong club number that is influenced by the songs of M.I.A., Jennifer Lopez, Gwen Stefani and Lil Wayne. "Sleazy" charted on both the Canadian Hot 100 and the United States Billboard Hot 100, peaking at 46 and 37, respectively.

== Background ==
"Sleazy" was written by Kesha alongside Lukasz Gottwald, Benjamin Levin, Shondrae Crawford and Klas Åhlund for Kesha's first extended play (EP), Cannibal (2010). The song was also produced by Bangladesh, Dr. Luke and Benny Blanco with engineering done by Emily Wright, Sam Holland, Chris "TEK" O'Ryan and Chris Holmes. The song was released on October 29, 2010, as a digital download. It was also released as a B-side to the single "We R Who We R" in the United Kingdom on January 16, 2011. While working on the album, Kesha enlisted the help of producer Bangladesh. He explained that Kesha chose to include him on the project because she wanted to add a tougher edge to her music, "She says she wanna be gangster".

== Composition ==
"Sleazy"
Kesha raps over a prominent bass line as she talks about wealthy men that are trying to buy her attention.

"Sleazy" is a Electro-hop song that is three minutes and twenty-five seconds in length. On the song, Kesha criticizes wealthy men who try to buy her attention. It also contains suggestive innuendos such as, "Rat tat tat on your dumb dumb drum, the beat so fat gonna make me cum, um um um, over to your place." Vocally, the song follows in similar form to her previous singles footsteps as Kesha uses her "sing-rap" vocal style present throughout the song. Kesha uses layered vocals that are processed in places by Auto-Tune. Chad Grisgow of IGN described the musical accompaniment as "a thundering bass line and ticking beat."

Production of the song has been cited for drawing influence from multiple songs including; Gwen Stefani's "Hollaback Girl" for its "swagga", Jennifer Lopez's "Love Don't Cost a Thing" for its "attitude", as well as combining "a touch of Lil Wayne's 'A Milli'". Josh Langhoff from PopMatters, however, felt that Kesha was styling herself after M.I.A. Jocelyn Vena, from MTV News, commented that "Sleazy" "fits right in with [Kesha's] party-anthem discography". Daniel Brockman of The Boston Phoenix wrote that the song contains "tribal anti-bourgeois bounce[s]". Bill Lamb from About.com noted that Bangladesh's production "pumps up the hard edge and club readiness". "The Sleazy Remix" features rapper André 3000, who raps over the song's "bouncy thump" beat talking about a young child dealing with his deadbeat father, "We start out so cute in our baby pictures/ That mama shot for our daddy so that he wouldn't forget you/ He forgot anyway, but hey, one day he'll remember/ If not, he's human, I'm human, you human, we'll forgive him." André then transitions into a rap about his friendship with Kesha before she takes over the rest of the song.

== Critical reception ==
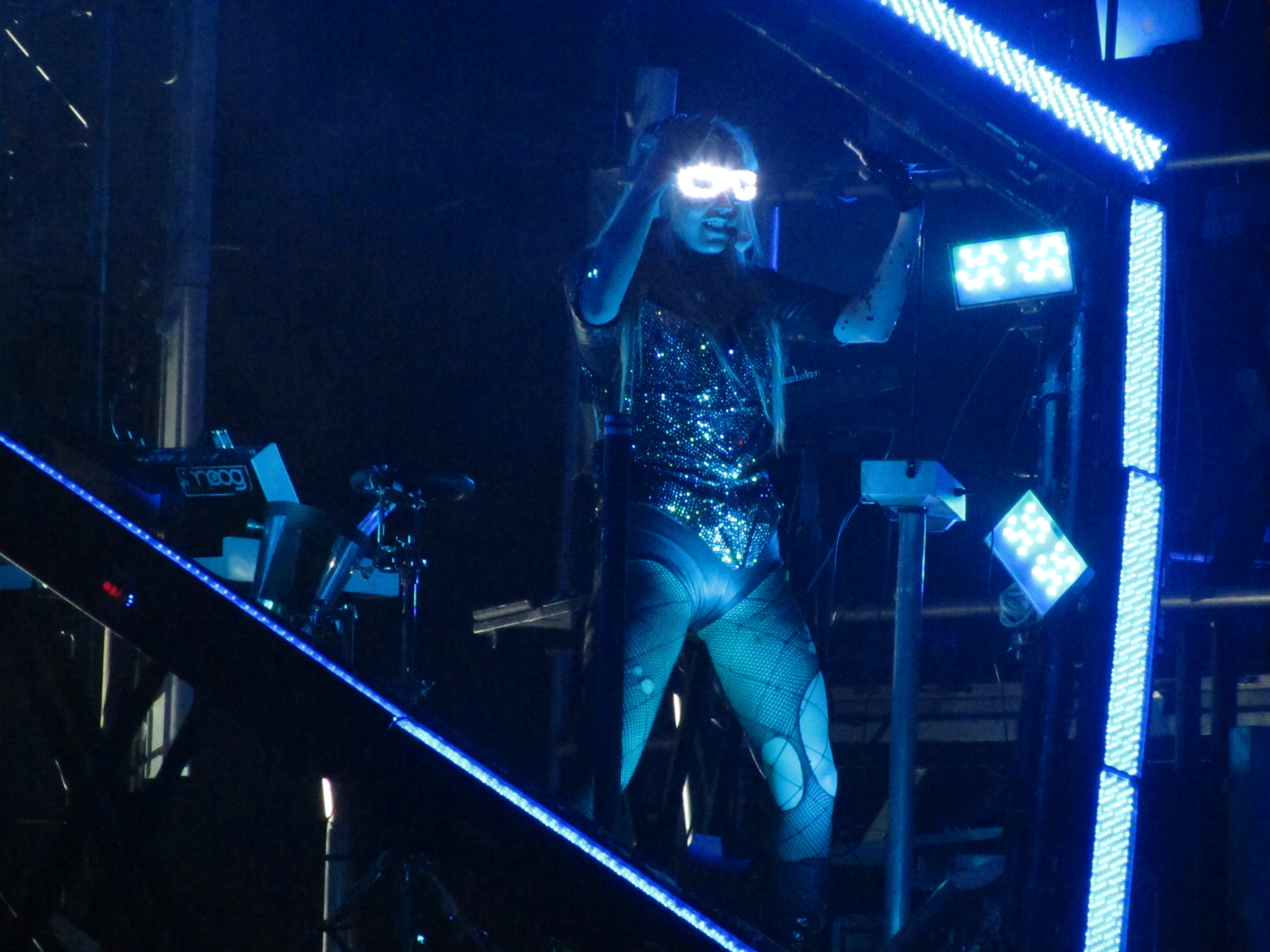
Kesha performing "Sleazy" at the Get Sleazy Tour

Stephen Thomas Erlewine from AllMusic called "Sleazy" "apropos", writing that she is able to self-realize that "her calling card is her unrepentant filthiness." Jocelyn Vena of MTV News was positive in the song's review writing that it was "club-banging glory thanks to a killer beat and funky sing-along lyrics". Nadine Cheung from AOL Radio felt that the song followed similar form to "We R Who We R", writing: "[following] the anthemic lead single, "We R Who We R" [...] [Sleazy is] [i]n true Kesha form, the Nashville native uses her sing-song rapping style to eschew the luxe life: "I don't need you or your brand new Benz, or your bourgie [sic] friends / I don't need love lookin' like diamonds / Lookin' like diamonds." Chad Grischow from IGN noted that Kesha's "'broke and proud of it' attitude is a refreshing change for the money flaunting pop landscape". Gary Graff wrote for Billboard that "the addition of producer Bangladesh for the martial "Sleazy" lets Ke$ha sink her teeth into some fresh flavors on Cannibal, which will certainly enhance her Animal attraction".

Josh Langhoff of PopMatters noted that though rap may not be her "steez", "you can tell she works hard at it" as she "rattles off a well-constructed string of rapid-fire syllables" Leah Greenblatt of Entertainment Weekly recommended "Sleazy" as a downloadable track, commenting it is "a boom-box stomper". Sal Cinquemani of Slant Magazine commented on "Sleazy"'s change of producer, writing that although Bangladesh produced it and Åhlund penned it, Kesha did not accomplish anything significant. Melinda Newman of HitFix called the song "the most interesting song on the album" and wrote that the song featured a "compelling ... sung chorus."

== Chart and commercial performance ==
In the United States, "Sleazy" entered the Billboard Hot 100 on the issue week ending November 20, 2010, at position 51, where it reached its peak. The song stayed on the chart for one week before falling off. In Canada, "Sleazy" entered the Canadian Hot 100 in the same week at position forty-six, also only charting for one week. On the week of December 31, 2011, "Sleazy" re-entered the Billboard Hot 100. The song reached a new peak of 37 and 15 on the Digital Sales chart, selling 63,000 copies that week. The song has since obtained a gold certification as of December 13, 2018 in the United States by the nation's RIAA (Recording Industry Association of America) for reaching 500,000 combined sales and streaming equivalent units in the country.

== Remixes ==
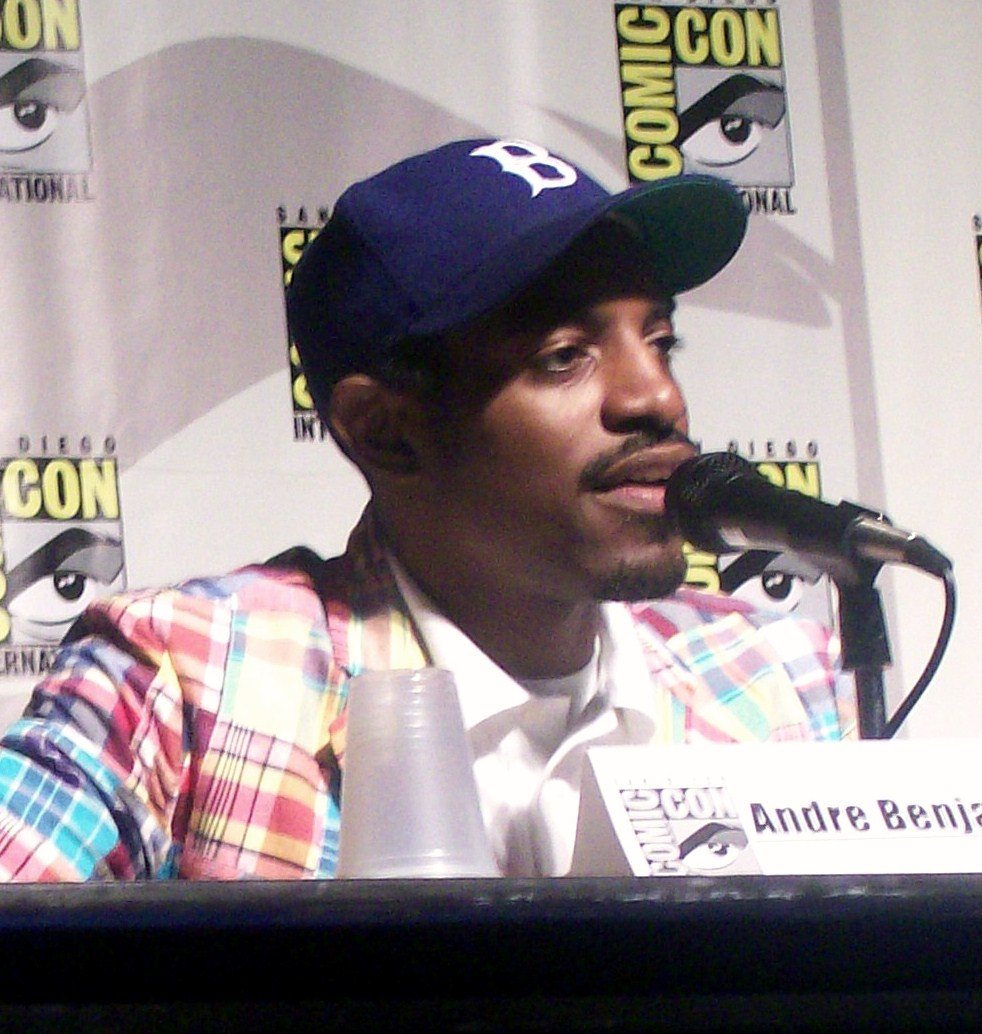
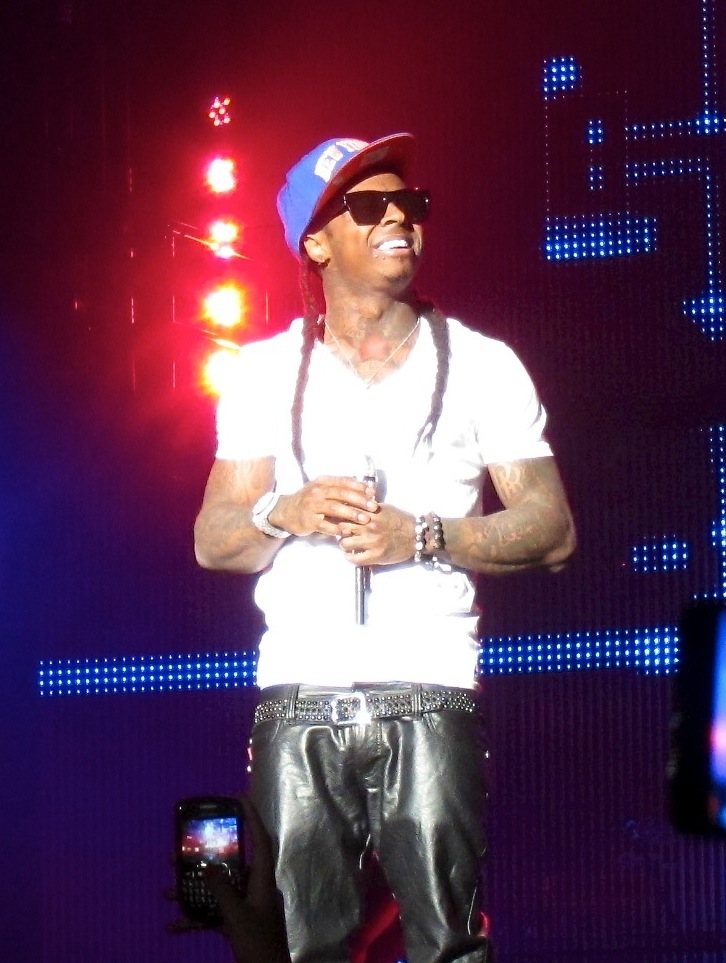
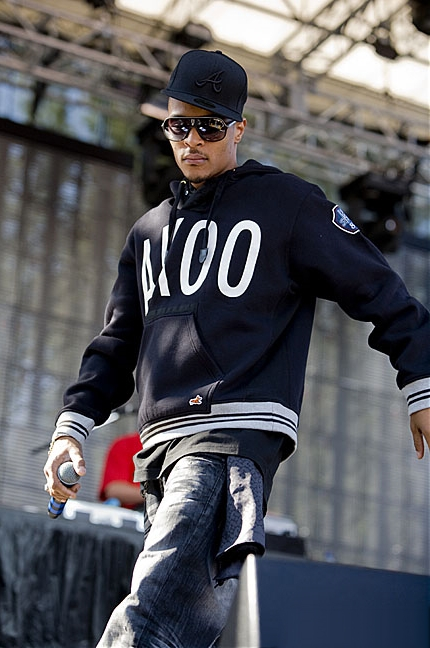
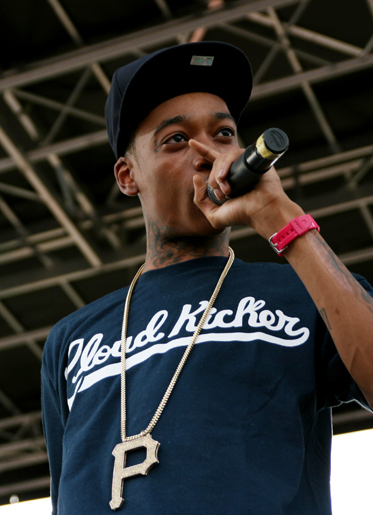
André 3000 is featured on the original remix of the song. He also appears with Lil Wayne, T.I., and Wiz Khalifa, on a separate remix titled "Sleazy Remix 2.0: Get Sleazier".

André 3000 is featured on an official remix of the song, released digitally on January 18, 2011. Kesha explained to Rap-Up how she got him to record a verse for the song: "I sent him the track and was fully aware that he's only been on a few songs in the past five years. But he ended up liking it. We got on the phone, and he said, 'With a flow like that, you could definitely have a career as a rapper.' It was the biggest compliment I've ever had. It was coming from a god!" She further elaborated that André 3000 is "one of my favorite musicians, lyricists, rappers, of all time."

After the release of the original remix with André, Kesha and co-producer of the track, Luke, decided that they wanted to remix the track again with the intention of adding some of Kesha's desired future collaborations. The first to add their verses to the track was Lil Wayne. Kesha and Wayne both happened to be in the studio on the same day as each other and she took the opportunity to ask him if he would participate in the remixing of the song. Following this, Wiz Khalifa and T.I. were then asked to collaborate on the track. All three rappers agreed to write and appear on the song and with this the remix was completed. According to Kesha, the four rappers on the remix, titled "Sleazy Remix 2.0: Get Sleazier", are included because they are four of her favorite rappers. On December 7, 2011, she posted the following message on the internet, revealing that the song would be released exclusively to iTunes on December 13, 2011: "Get ready to get even $leazier with this sick collaboration I did with 4 of my favorite MCs of all time: Weezy, André 3000, Wiz Khalifa, and T.I., I opened the 'Get $leazy' tour with this song every night and it always got the party started ... Get ready, this is the SICKEST and SLEAZIEST version YET.$."

== Music video ==
The music video for the song was directed by Nicholaus Goossen and was released on January 27, 2012. The director of the video enlisted actors and some of Kesha's friends to lip-sync over the song's production and verses. A drag queen performs Khalifa's verses, while Napoleon Dynamite actor Efren Ramirez raps over André's verse, and finally an elderly man can be seen playing chess while lip-syncing to T.I's verse. Kesha and the featured artists on the remix cameo in the video for a short time where they are seen on television screens, which are later smashed by a man wearing a bandanna. Jessica Sager from PopCrush wrote that even with Kesha absent from the video it was still in her style, writing: "Even without Kesha, the remix video is still ... well, 'Kesha'." Rap-Up magazine wrote that the video was comical and unexpected. A Directors Cut version, featuring scenes with Kesha, was leaked on August 20, 2012.

== Cover versions ==
American singer-songwriter and musician Ben Folds originally covered the song in November 2010, in Columbus, Ohio. Following this, Folds recorded the song for Download to Donate's Tsunami Relief album for Japan in 2011 and included it on his compilation album with Ben Folds Five, The Best Imitation of Myself: A Retrospective later that year.. Amanda Hensel of PopCrush commented that the cover was executed "so artistically that it's like a whole new song". Eliot Glazer of MTV Buzzworthy felt that the idea of Folds covering "Sleazy" was a "welcome experiment". Glazer praised Folds' vocals on the track and went on to say "we don't know what's more epic: the cover of the song or the mere fact that it happened in the first place".

== Track listing ==
UK Digital EP

1. "We R Who We R" – 3:24
2. "Sleazy" – 3:25
3. "Animal" (Dave Audé Remix) – 4:37
4. "Animal" (Billboard Remix) – 4:15

Digital download (The Remix)

1. "The Sleazy Remix" (featuring André 3000) – 3:48

Digital download (Remix 2.0)

1. "Sleazy Remix 2.0: Get Sleazier" (feat. Lil Wayne, Wiz Khalifa, T.I. & André 3000) – 4:53

== Credits and personnel ==
- Songwriting – Kesha Sebert, Lukasz Gottwald, Benjamin Levin, Shondrae Crawford, Klas Åhlund
- Production – Bangladesh, Dr. Luke, Benny Blanco
- Instruments and programming – Bangladesh, Dr. Luke, Benny Blanco
- Background vocals – Rani Hancock, Dr. Luke, Sam Holland, Benny Blanco, Emily Wright
- Engineering – Emily Wright, Sam Holland, Chris "TEK" O'Ryan, Chris Holmes

Credits adapted from the liner notes of Cannibal, Dynamite Cop Music/Where Da Kasz At BMI.

== Charts ==
Chart performance for "Sleazy"
Chart (2010–2012)	Peak position
Canada Hot 100 (Billboard)	46
South Korea Foreign (Gaon)	31
South Korea Foreign (Gaon) Remix 2.0 Get Sleazier	19
US Billboard Hot 100	37

== Certifications ==
Region	Certification	Certified units/sales
United States (RIAA)	Gold	500,000^{‡}
^{‡} Sales+streaming figures based on certification alone.
