= Rani Hancock =

American music industry executive

- Born: New York
- Education: Berklee College of Music
- Occupation: Music industry executive
- Title: Executive vice president and head of A&R, Columbia Records
- Website: columbiarecords.com

Rani Hancock is an American music industry executive. She is the executive vice president and head of A&R at Columbia Records. She was previously executive vice president and head of A&R at Island Records, executive vice president of A&R at RCA Records, and the president of Sire Records.

Hancock attended the Berklee College of Music and graduated with a degree in production and engineering. She began her career at Arista Records, where she was mentored by Clive Davis.
