= Kesha videography =

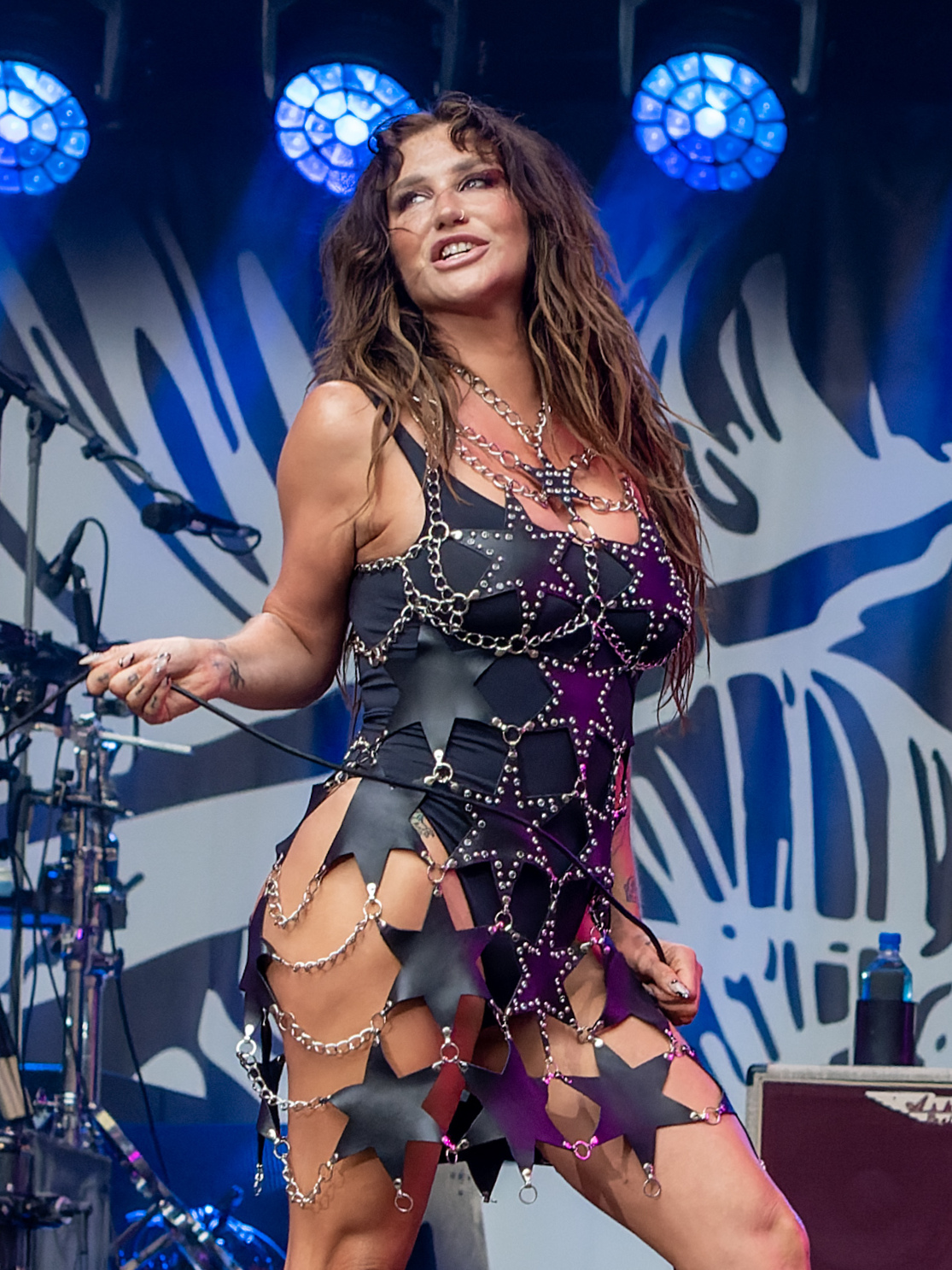
Kesha performing in 2022.

Kesha is an American singer and songwriter. She has appeared in 58 music videos, 42 as the lead artist, 12 as a featured artist, and 4 as a guest. She has appeared in 9 films, 41 TV shows, and 2 web shows. Some of the television shows she has appeared in include Nashville, RuPaul's Drag Race, Jane the Virgin, Victorious, and more.

She first made a cameo appearance in Katy Perry's "I Kissed a Girl" music video, though she was unknown then. Kesha declined to appear in the music video to Flo Rida's massively successful single "Right Round", to which she provided guest vocals to.

In 2009, Kesha released the music video for her debut single, "Tik Tok". Her song "Backstabber" was scheduled to be the second single from her debut studio album, Animal, but it was scrapped in place for "Blah Blah Blah" featuring 3OH!3. The music video was filmed and was leaked online. In 2010, she released the videos for "Blah Blah Blah", "Your Love Is My Drug", & "Take It Off", all taken from Animal. She later appeared as a featured artist in the music videos for "Dirty Picture" with Taio Cruz and "My First Kiss" with 3OH!3. Later that same year, she released music videos for the songs "Animal", "Stephen" and a second music video for "Take It Off", dubbed the "K$ N' Friends version", which featured Jeffree Star, all from her album Animal. Lastly, Kesha released the music video for "We R Who We R", from her debut extended play, Cannibal.

In the following year, Kesha released the music video for the second single from Cannibal, "Blow", which featured actor James Van Der Beek playing Kesha's comedic rival. She guest starred as herself in the Nickelodeon show, Victorious in the episode "Ice Cream for Ke$ha" where the main characters search for the letters to Kesha's name to win a private concert.

In 2012, Kesha released a music video for "Sleazy Remix 2.0: Get Sleazier" featuring rappers Wiz Khalifa, T.I., André 3000, & Lil Wayne, though none of the rappers actually appear in the video. Instead, many other friends of Kesha's mouth the lyrics to the song, while Kesha herself only appears for a short time in the video. She released the music video for the lead single from her second studio album, Warrior, "Die Young" which depicted her as a cult leader in Mexico.

In 2013, she released the music videos for the singles "C'Mon" and "Crazy Kids" from the album Warrior, the latter featuring rapper will.i.am. She then went on to appear in the music video for "Timber" alongside Pitbull in which she also provided guest vocals to. Later for New Years, Kesha made her directorial debut with the music video for "Dirty Love", though this version of the song did not include Iggy Pop, rather a solo version was used instead.

After leaving rehab for her eating disorder in 2014, Kesha became a judge for the reality singing competition show, Rising Star. The other judging panel consisted of Ludacris and Brad Paisley with Josh Groban as the host. The show was canceled after one season. Kesha and her cat, Mr. Peeps, made a cameo appearance in the music video for "My Song 5" by HAIM.

In 2015, Kesha appeared in the mid-credits scene of the film Jem and the Holograms as Pizzazz, the leader of the rival band to Jem and the Holograms, The Misfits.

In 2017, Kesha released her comeback single, "Praying" after not releasing any new solo work in five years. She released the accompanying music video along with two more for "Woman" and "Learn to Let Go" from her third studio album Rainbow. The music video for "Hymn" was filmed but it wasn't released until the following year. She appeared in the music video for "Good Old Days", her song with Macklemore.

In 2018, Kesha released the music video for her cover of Janis Joplin's "I Need A Man To Love", retitled "I Need A Woman To Love" from the LGBTQ inclusive EP, Universal Love - Wedding Songs Reimagined. On August 10, 2018, she released her documentary short film Rainbow - The Film on Apple Music. It follows her personal struggles, the creation of Rainbow, and her performance at the Grammy's. Kesha also appeared in the music video for the duet version of The Struts' "Body Talks" in August. The official music video for the song "Here Comes the Change" for the film On the Basis of Sex was live streamed on October 24, 2018 on her YouTube.

== Music videos ==
=== As lead artist ===
Title	Year	Director(s)
"Tik Tok"	2009	Syndrome
"Blah Blah Blah" (featuring 3OH!3)	2010	Brendan Malloy
"Your Love Is My Drug"	2010	Honey
"Take It Off"	2010	Paul Hunter & Dori Oskowitz
"Take It Off" (K$ N' Friends version)	2010	SKINNY
"Stephen"	2010	SKINNY
"Animal"	2010	SKINNY
"We R Who We R"	2010	Hype Williams
"Blow"	2011	Chris Marrs Piliero
"Sleazy Remix 2.0: Get Sleazier" (featuring Lil Wayne, Wiz Khalifa, T.I. and André 3000)	2012	Nicholaus Goossen
"Die Young"	2012	Darren Craig
"C'Mon"	2013	Darren Craig
"Crazy Kids" (featuring will.i.am)	2013	Darren Craig
"Dirty Love"	2013	Kesha
"Praying"	2017	Jonas Åkerlund
"Woman" (featuring The Dap-Kings Horns)	2017	Kesha & Lagan Sebert
"Learn to Let Go"	2017	Isaac Ravishankara
"Rainbow"	2017	Lagan Sebert
"I Need a Woman to Love"	2018	Lagan Sebert
"Hymn"	2018	Isaac Ravishankara
"Here Comes the Change"	2018	Jonas Åkerlund
"This Is Me" (The Reimagined Remix) (with Keala Settle & Missy Elliott)	2018	Jared Hogan
"Raising Hell" (featuring Big Freedia)	2019	Luke Gilford
"My Own Dance"	2019	Allie Avital
"Resentment" (featuring Brian Wilson, Sturgill Simpson, & Wrabel)	2019	Vittorio Masecchia
"High Road"	2020	Magic Seed Productions
"Children of the Revolution"	2020	Ethan Silverman
"Since I Was Young" (with Wrabel)	2020	Michael Kessler
"Little Bit of Love"	2020	Kesha, Jonah Best & Mr Peep$
"Drop Dead" (with Grandson & Travis Barker)	2021	Andrew Sandler
"Rich, White, Straight Men"	2022	Pebe Sebert
"Eat the Acid" (Visualizer)	2023	Vincent Haycock
"Fine Line" (Visualizer)	2023	Vincent Haycock
"Hate Me Harder" (Visualizer)	2023	Vincent Haycock
"Happy" (Visualizer)	2023	Vincent Haycock
"Living In My Head" (Visualizer)	2023	Vincent Haycock
"Only Love Can Save Us Now"	2023	Vincent Haycock
"Joyride"	2024	Lauren Gorun, Dimitri Basil, Cooper Roussel, & Kesha
"Boy Crazy"	2025	Brett Loudermilk, Zain Curtis, & Kesha
"Dear Me"	2025	Jessa Zarubica
"Red Flag"	2026	Kesha
"Origami!"	2026	Kesha, Brett Loudermilk, & Zain Curtis
"Backstabber"	2026	Syndrome

=== As featured artist ===
List of music videos, showing lead artist, year released, and director
Title	Lead artist	Year	Director(s)	Notes
"Right Round"	Flo Rida	2009	Malcolm Jones	Vocals only
"Dirty Picture"	Taio Cruz	2010	Alex Herron	Featured artist
"My First Kiss"	3OH!3	2010	Isaac Ravishankara	Featured artist
"Timber"	Pitbull	2013	Davis Rousseau	Featured artist
"Good Old Days"	Macklemore	2017	Johnny Valencia	Featured artist
"Body Talks"	The Struts	2018	Lagan Sebert	Featured artist
"Safe"	Sage, Chika	2018	Ben Smith	Vocals only
"Chasing Rainbows"	Big Freedia	2020	Lagan Sebert	Featured artist
"Stronger"	Sam Feldt	2021	Andrew Donoho	Featured artist
"Fancy Like"	Walker Hayes	2021	Rehman Nizar Ali	Featured artist
"Taste So Good (The Cann Song)"	Vincint, Hayley Kiyoko, and MNEK	2022	Jake Wilson	Featured artist
"Sugar Free Venom"	f5ve	2025		Featured artist; archive footage

=== Guest appearances ===
List of music videos, showing lead artist, year released, and director
Title	Lead artist	Year	Director(s)	Notes
"I Kissed a Girl"	Katy Perry	2008	Kinga Burza	Cameo
"American Girl" (Promotional video)	Bonnie McKee	2013		Cameo
"My Song 5"	Haim	2014	Dugan O'Neal	Cameo
"If the World Was Ending (In Support of Doctors Without Borders)"	JP Saxe, Julia Michaels & Friends	2020	Unknown	Cameo

== Films ==
List of cinematic film releases, showing year released, role, director(s) and box office gross
Title	Year	Role	Director(s)	Budget	Box office	Ref.
Title	Year	Role	Director(s)	USD$		Ref.
F.A.R.T. the Movie	1991	Girl	Ray Etheridge	43,000		
Dreamgirls	2006	Extra	Bill Condon	80,000,000	155,400,000	
Bravo Supershow	2007	Herself	Michael Maier	Not screened		
Walt Disney's Princess Ke$ha	2011	Princess Ke$ha	Osmany Rodriguez; Matt Villines	Not screened		
Katy Perry: Part of Me	2012	Herself	Dan Cutforth; Jane Lipsitz	13,000,000	32,726,956	
Jem and the Holograms	2015	Phyllis "Pizzazz" Gabor	Jon M. Chu	5,000,000	2,500,000	
A Ghost Story	2017	Spirit Girl	David Lowery	100,000	1,900,000	
Rainbow: The Film	2018	Herself	Kesha; Lagan Sebert; Kevin Hayden	Not screened		
Diane Warren: Relentless	2024	Herself	Bess Kargman			

== Television ==
Year	Title	Role	Notes
2005	The Simple Life	Herself	Episode: "Wedding Planner" (Season 3, Episode 15)
2010	Saturday Night Live	Herself	Episode: "Ryan Phillippe/Kesha" (Season 35, Episode 19)
2010	The City	Herself	Episode: "One Girl's Trash..." (Season 2, Episode 9)
2011	Victorious	Herself	Episode: "Ice Cream for Kesha" (Season 2, Episode 3)
2012	The X Factor Australia	Herself	Guest mentor; 2 episodes
2013	Robot Chicken	Robot, Sassette Smurfling	Episode: "Papercut to Aorta" (Season 6, Episode 14)
2013	Kesha: My Crazy Beautiful Life	Herself	Lead role; 14 episodes
2013	The Show with Vinny	Herself	Episode: "Mark Wahlberg, Anthony Mackie and Kesha" (Season 1, Episode 3)
2014	Rising Star	Herself	Judge; 10 episodes
2015	Jane the Virgin	Anabelle	Episode: "Chapter Twenty-Four"
2015	Project Runway: All Stars	Herself	Guest Judge; Episode: "Once Upon A Runway"
2016	The Haunting Of...	Herself	Guest appearance
2016	Hollywood Game Night	Herself	Episode: "Sealed with a Kesha"
2016	Nashville	Herself	Guest appearance
2017	RuPaul's Drag Race	Herself	Guest Judge; Episode: "Makeovers: Crew Better Work" (Season 9, Episode 10)
2017	Kat	Kat (voice)	10 episodes; Amazon Prime series
2017	Good Morning America	Herself	Performer and interview
2017	CMT Crossroads	Herself	Episode: "Old Crow Medicine Show & Kesha"
2018	60th Annual Grammy Awards	Herself	Performer and nominee
2018	The Tonight Show Starring Jimmy Fallon	Herself	Performer along with The Struts
2019	Jimmy Kimmel Live!	Herself	Performer along with Big Freedia
2019	47th Annual American Music Awards	Herself	Performer along with Big Freedia
2019	The Graham Norton Show	Herself	Performer
2020	The Late Show with Stephen Colbert	Herself	Interview and performer along with Big Freedia
2020	The Late Late Show with James Corden	Herself	Interview and performer
2020	Carpool Karaoke: The Series	Herself	Episode: "Kesha & Whitney Cummings"
2020	The Bachelor: Listen to Your Heart	Herself	Guest Judge
2020	One World: Together at Home	Herself	Benefit concert
2020	Together in Pride: You Are Not Alone	Herself	Benefit concert
2020	The Tonight Show Starring Jimmy Fallon	Herself	Performer
2022	Conjuring Kesha	Herself	Also executive producer
2023	Impractical Jokers	Herself	Season 10, Episode "Kesha"
2023	60 Minutes	Herself	
2023	The Muppets Mayhem	Herself	Season 1, Episode 4: "Track 4: The Times They Are A-Changn'"
2023	That's My Jam	Herself	Winner; Episode: "Kenan Thompson & Big Boi vs. Kesha & Renée Elise Goldsberry" (Season 2, Episode 7)
2023	Dynamo Is Dead	Herself	
2025	The Real Housewives of Beverly Hills	Herself	Episode: "Venom in the Viper Room"
2025	The Kelly Clarkson Show	Herself	
2025	The Drew Barrymore Show	Herself	
2025	Loot	Herself	Episode: "Joyride"
2025	The Jennifer Hudson Show	Herself	
2026	Love Island USA	Herself	Season 8; Cameo

== Web series ==
Year	Title	Role	Note
2017	Highly Gifted	Tess (voice)	Snapchat series
2023–2024	Helluva Boss	Queen Bee-lzebub (voice)	2 episodes Credited as "Kesha Sebert" in "Queen Bee" (Season 1, Episode 8)

== Podcasts ==
Year	Title	Role	Notes	Ref.
2021	Electric Easy	Zephyr, Money	10 episodes	
