= The Adventures of Kesha and Macklemore =

2018 concert tour by Kesha & Macklemore

- Continental tour by Kesha and Macklemore
- Location: North America
- Associated albums: Rainbow; Gemini
- Start date: June 6, 2018
- End date: August 5, 2018
- No. of shows: 30
Supporting acts
- Wes Period
Kesha tour chronology
Rainbow Tour (2017–19)	The Adventures of Kesha and Macklemore (2018)	Kesha's Weird and Wonderful Rainbow Ride (2019)
Macklemore tour chronology
The Gemini Tour (2017–18)	The Adventures of Kesha and Macklemore (2018)

The Adventures of Kesha and Macklemore is the co-headlining tour by American singer Kesha and American rapper Macklemore, in support of Kesha's third studio album Rainbow and Macklemore's second solo studio album Gemini, both released in 2017. The tour began in Phoenix on June 6, 2018, and ended in Tampa on August 5, 2018.

== Background and development ==
On January 18, 2017, Macklemore posted a photo of him and Kesha together on Instagram, hinting at an upcoming collaboration. When the tracklist of Gemini was unveiled on August 22, 2017, it was revealed that Macklemore and Kesha have worked together on a track named "Good Old Days". The song was released as a promotional single on September 19, 2017, and was sent to adult contemporary radio on October 9, 2017, as the album's third single.

On December 11, 2017, Kesha and Macklemore released a video announcing a joint tour together in the summer of 2018. One dollar from each ticket purchase benefited charity. Kesha donated her proceeds to the anti-sexual assault organization Rape, Abuse & Incest National Network (RAINN), while Macklemore contributed to social and racial justice organization Plus1.

== Set list ==
This set list is from the show in Kansas City on June 26, 2018. It does not represent all concerts for the duration of the tour.

=== Kesha ===
1. "Woman"
2. "Boogie Feet"
3. "We R Who We R"
4. "Good Old Days"
5. "Bastards"
6. "Jolene"
7. "Timber"
8. "Die Young"
9. "Your Love Is My Drug"
10. "Take It Off"
11. "Blow"
12. "Praying"

Encore

13. "Tik Tok"

=== Macklemore ===
1. "Ain't Gonna Die Tonight"
2. "Thrift Shop"
3. "White Walls"
4. "Same Love"
5. "Otherside"
6. "Willy Wonka"
7. "Dance Off"
8. "Can't Hold Us"
9. "Downtown"

Encore

10. "Glorious"

== Tour dates ==
List of concerts, showing date, city, country, venue, opening acts, tickets sold, number of available tickets and amount of gross revenue
Date	City	Country	Venue	Opening acts	Attendance	Revenue
June 6, 2018	Phoenix	United States	Ak-Chin Pavilion	Wes Period	—N/a	—N/a
June 8, 2018	Inglewood	United States	The Forum	Wes Period	11,547 / 12,685	$527,090
June 9, 2018	Las Vegas	United States	Mandalay Bay Events Center	Wes Period	7,465 / 8,087	$378,260
June 12, 2018	Chula Vista	United States	Mattress Firm Amphitheatre	Wes Period	—N/a	—N/a
June 14, 2018	Mountain View	United States	Shoreline Amphitheatre	Wes Period	—N/a	—N/a
June 16, 2018	West Valley City	United States	USANA Amphitheatre	Wes Period	—N/a	—N/a
June 17, 2018	Denver	United States	Pepsi Center	Wes Period	—N/a	—N/a
June 20, 2018	Dallas	United States	Dos Equis Pavilion	Wes Period	—N/a	—N/a
June 22, 2018	Austin	United States	Austin360 Amphitheater	Wes Period	—N/a	—N/a
June 23, 2018	The Woodlands	United States	Cynthia Woods Mitchell Pavilion	Wes Period	—N/a	—N/a
June 25, 2018	Rogers	United States	Walmart Arkansas Music Pavilion	Wes Period	—N/a	—N/a
June 26, 2018	Kansas City	United States	Sprint Center	Wes Period	—N/a	—N/a
July 10, 2018	Maryland Heights	United States	Hollywood Casino Amphitheatre	Wes Period	—N/a	—N/a
July 11, 2018	Cincinnati	United States	Riverbend Music Center	Wes Period	—N/a	—N/a
July 13, 2018	Nashville	United States	Bridgestone Arena	Wes Period	10,756 / 10,756	$447,181
July 14, 2018	Tinley Park	United States	Hollywood Casino Amphitheatre	Wes Period	—N/a	—N/a
July 16, 2018	Toronto	Canada	Budweiser Stage	Wes Period	—N/a	—N/a
July 18, 2018	Clarkston	United States	DTE Energy Music Theatre	Wes Period	—N/a	—N/a
July 19, 2018	Noblesville	United States	Ruoff Home Mortgage Music Center	Wes Period	—N/a	—N/a
July 21, 2018	Hershey	United States	Hersheypark Stadium	Wes Period	—N/a	—N/a
July 22, 2018	Darien	United States	Darien Lake Performing Arts Center	Wes Period	—N/a	—N/a
July 24, 2018	Mansfield	United States	Xfinity Center	Wes Period	—N/a	—N/a
July 25, 2018	Camden	United States	BB&T Pavilion	Wes Period	—N/a	—N/a
July 27, 2018	Holmdel	United States	PNC Bank Arts Center	Wes Period	—N/a	—N/a
July 28, 2018	Bristow	United States	Jiffy Lube Live	Wes Period	—N/a	—N/a
July 30, 2018	Wantagh	United States	Jones Beach Theater	Wes Period	—N/a	—N/a
August 1, 2018	Charlotte	United States	PNC Music Pavilion	Wes Period	—N/a	—N/a
August 2, 2018	Atlanta	United States	Cellairis Amphitheatre	Wes Period	—N/a	—N/a
August 4, 2018	Miami	United States	American Airlines Arena	Wes Period	—N/a	—N/a
August 5, 2018	Tampa	United States	MidFlorida Credit Union Amphitheatre	Wes Period	—N/a	—N/a
Total					29,768 / 31,528 (94%)	$1,352,531
