= Rainbow (Kesha album) =

2017 studio album by Kesha

- Explicit album cover

Studio album by Kesha
- Released: August 11, 2017
- Recorded: 2014–2017
- Studios: Elysian Park (Los Angeles); Hit Factory Criteria (Miami); House of Blues Studios (Nashville); MV Bliss (Antibes, France); NRG (North Hollywood, California); Purple Dinosaur Studios; Scotch Cornet Studios (Glendale, California); Sound Emporium (Nashville); Southern Ground (Nashville); The Green Building (Santa Monica, California); Village Recorder (Los Angeles); Westlake (Los Angeles)
- Genres: Pop; pop rock; country pop
- Length: 48:36
- Labels: Kemosabe; RCA
- Producers: Kesha; Brody Brown; Rogét Chahayed; Stuart Crichton; Ben Folds; Ryan Lewis; Nate Mercereau; Rick Nowels; Drew Pearson; Jonny Price; Ricky Reed; Pebe Sebert

Kesha chronology
Deconstructed (2012)	Rainbow (2017)	High Road (2020)

Singles from Rainbow
- 1. "Praying" Released: July 6, 2017; 2. "Woman" Released: January 22, 2018

Rainbow is the third studio album by American singer and songwriter Kesha. It was released on August 11, 2017, by Kemosabe and RCA Records. Primarily a pop record, Rainbow incorporates elements of pop rock, glam rock, neo soul, and country pop. Its lyrical themes range from letting go of the past, finding forgiveness within oneself for past mistakes, self-worth, and female empowerment. Kesha assumed an integral role in the album's production and collaborated with several producers, including Ricky Reed, Drew Pearson, Ben Folds, and her mother Pebe Sebert.

Following the release of her second studio album, Warrior (2012), Kesha dealt with several struggles in her personal and professional life, including a stint in a treatment center for an eating disorder and emotional issues, as well as a highly publicized legal battle with her former record producer Dr. Luke, whom she accused of sexual, physical, and emotional abuse. Kesha began writing material for her next album while in rehab in 2014 and as her recording contract at the time obliged her to work with Dr. Luke, she later recorded a series of new songs on her own and gave them to her record label.

In 2016, it was confirmed that work had officially commenced on Kesha's third studio album, with Sony Music Entertainment assuring Kesha she would be able to produce a new album without having to work with Dr. Luke, the founder of Kemosabe Records. "Praying" was released as the lead single from Rainbow in July 2017, going on to be certified platinum in several countries worldwide. "Woman" was released as the second single from the album thereafter, seeing moderate commercial success worldwide. The tracks "Learn to Let Go" and "Hymn" were also released as the album's two promotional singles.

Rainbow marks a noticeable departure from the electropop sound of Kesha's first two studio albums. She co-wrote all but one of the original tracks on the album, and said that she wanted her new music to reflect that she is a "real person having a complete human experience," stating that there was no balance in her previous work. Kesha stated that the album was inspired by several of her musical influences, including Iggy Pop, T. Rex, Dolly Parton, the Beatles, the Rolling Stones, the Beach Boys, James Brown, and Sweet. The album also features collaborations and guest appearances by Parton, Eagles of Death Metal, and the Dap-Kings Horns.

Rainbow debuted at number one on the Billboard 200 chart in the United States with 117,000 album-equivalent units and was the subject of widespread acclaim from music critics, with several complimenting the feminist angle and uniqueness of the record as well as Kesha's vocal performance and ability to interweave different genres of music on the album. The album has been certified Platinum by the Recording Industry Association of America (RIAA) and was nominated for Best Pop Vocal Album at the 60th Annual Grammy Awards, marking Kesha's first Grammy nomination. Kesha promoted the album through television and music festival performances and embarked on both the Rainbow Tour (2017–2019) and the Adventures of Kesha and Macklemore (2018), with American rapper Macklemore.

== Background and recording ==
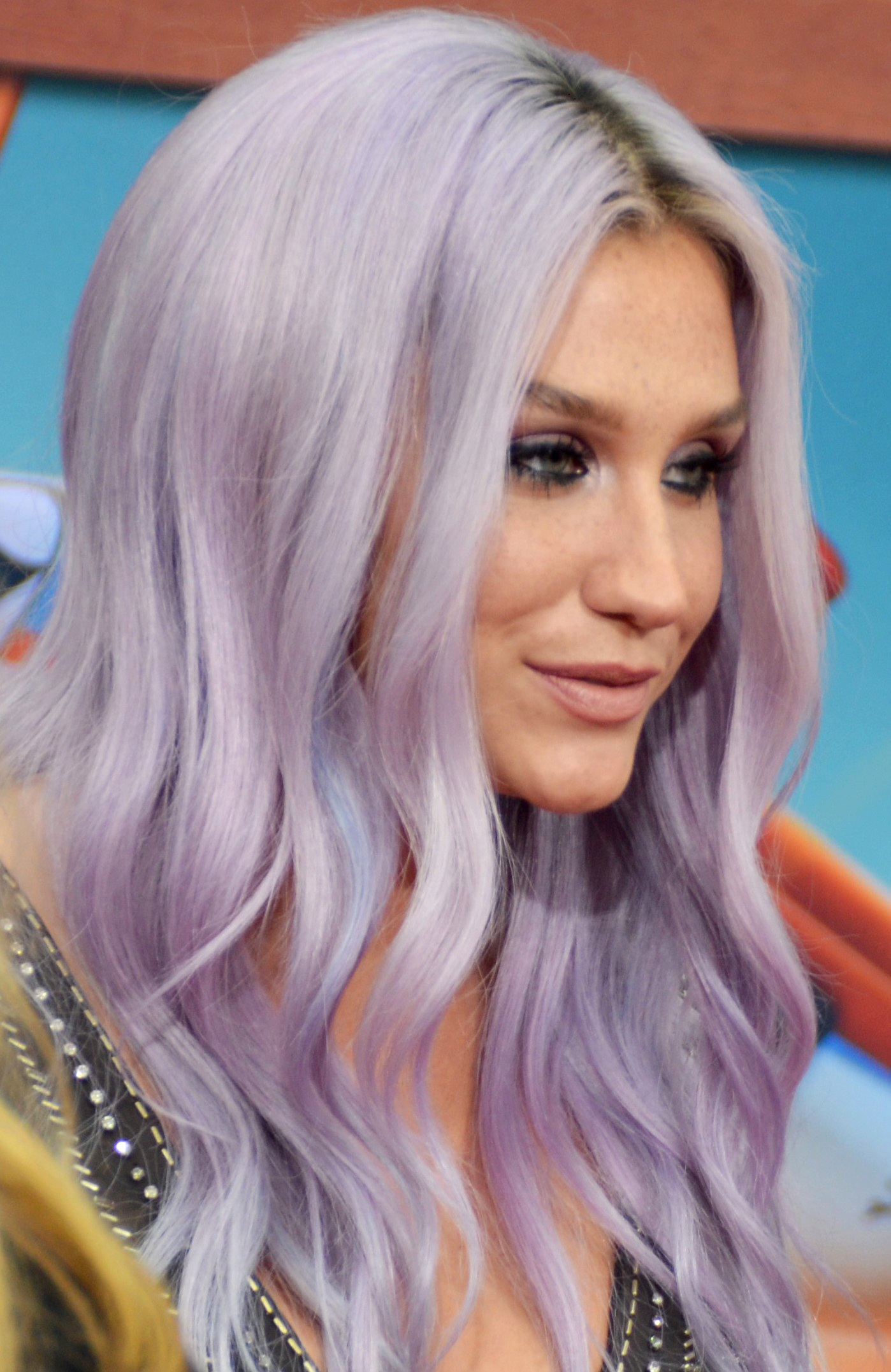
Kesha stated that Rainbow "quite literally" saved her life.

Kesha initially began writing songs for her third studio album while as a patient at Timberline Knolls, an Illinois treatment center, for an eating disorder in 2014. Eager to write music while in treatment, a friend brought her a toy keyboard, and after some negotiation, the staff let her keep it. She was not permitted to use any instrument with a power cord, explaining in an interview with Rolling Stone that the staff did not want her to have any objects that could be used for suicide: "And I was like, 'I respect all of that, but please let me have a keyboard or my brain's going to explode. My head has all these song ideas in it, and I just really need to play an instrument.'" She completed work on several songs while in treatment, and following her release from rehab, she removed the dollar sign from her name, explaining it as a way of taking back her power. In her August 2014 Teen Vogue cover interview, Kesha revealed she had recorded 14 new songs while in rehab. Thereafter, Kesha filed an ongoing lawsuit against her former producer, Dr. Luke, accusing him of sexual, physical and emotional abuse. Since her recording contract at the time obliged her to work with the man she accused of abuse, Kesha subsequently became unable to release any new music under her label unless she worked with Dr. Luke, to which she refused. As a result, Kesha recorded 22 new songs on her own during the legal battle and later gave them to her label. After Sony Music Entertainment assured the singer she would be able to produce a new album without Dr. Luke, the founder of her label, work on Kesha's third studio album officially commenced. In the summer of 2016, Kesha embarked on her third world tour, the Kesha and the Creepies: Fuck the World Tour. The tour commenced on July 23, 2016, in Las Vegas and ended on October 29, 2016, in Maine. The tour included various covers of songs and several rock and country reworks of her own hit singles.

In a New York Magazine profile in October 2016, Kesha stated that as much as her first two studio albums Animal (2010) and Warrior (2012) represented who she was, she felt there was "no balance", saying that she is "a real person having a complete human experience" and she wanted her future music to represent that: "To this day, I've never released a single that's a true ballad, and I feel like those are the songs that balance out the perception of you, because you can be a fun girl. You can go and have a crazy night out, but you also, as a human being, have vulnerable emotions. You have love." In an interview with Good Morning America the week of Rainbow's release, Kesha stated that she had written every song on the album and described Rainbow as "quite literally saving [her] life", and expressed her hope that the album would help people. She also explained the symbolism of the album's title, saying that she thinks "color symbolizes hope – and the rainbow, it's no coincidence that it's also the symbol for the LGBT community. I've always just found hope in the bright colors, and I wanted to bring that more into my everyday life. Now my house is covered in rainbows, and my life and my body – I have like 10 rainbow tattoos. I go to the tattoo artist and it's like, 'A rainbow something?'"

== Composition ==
Kesha has said that Rainbow was inspired by her "true" musical influences: Iggy Pop, T. Rex, Dolly Parton, the Beatles, the Rolling Stones, the Beach Boys, James Brown, and Sweet. The album contains a combination of both mellow songs and upbeat songs such as "Bastards" and "Woman", respectively. The album opens with the country-infused cut "Bastards", which, as Katie Baillie of Metro analyzed, is "about not letting the bullies drag you down." "Woman" was inspired by a "pussy grabbing comment" Donald Trump made, which angered Kesha and made her yell "I'm a motherfucking woman!" This line is included throughout the song. Kesha wrote the title track on a toy keyboard while in rehab. It opens only with vocals and basic chords played on a piano. The first line Kesha sings is, "Got back the stars in my eyes, I see the magic inside of me." Baillie writes that the track "builds in both sound and emotion [...] as a full live orchestra kicks in." Kesha was inspired to write "Learn to Let Go" by one of her friends who went through "the worst childhood imaginable." The track is also based on Kesha's struggles while making Rainbow.

== Artwork ==
The album cover and artwork was created by artist Robert Beatty. Kesha had requested for Beatty's help based on his artwork for Tame Impala and the Flaming Lips. Beatty worked with photographer Olivia Bee and art director Brian Roettinger. The cover itself features psychedelic imagery that is a trademark of Beatty's work.

== Promotion ==
Kesha performed in Japan at the Summer Sonic Festival on two dates: August 19 in Osaka and August 20, 2017, in Tokyo. Following this, Kesha staged a solo concert in Nagoya on August 21. In September, Kesha performed at the KAABOO and iHeartRadio festivals. Kesha was also a performer at the MTV Europe Music Awards on November 12. Kesha, alongside many other popular female singers, performed "Praying" at the 60th Annual Grammy Awards in 2018.

Kesha embarked on the Rainbow Tour, which began in Birmingham on September 26, 2017. She also went on a co-headlining tour with American rapper Macklemore named the Adventures of Kesha and Macklemore (2018). The tour took place in 30 cities in North America during the summer of 2018.

== Singles ==
The album's lead single, "Praying" was released on July 6, 2017, with the album's pre-order. The track was announced a day prior to the song's release and was co-written by Ryan Lewis. The song deals with Kesha's past suicidal thoughts and is suggested by reviewers that it is about Dr. Luke, although he is not named in the song. The song impacted US radio on July 18, 2017.

"Woman" was released as the album's first promotional single on July 13, 2017. The song was released as the second and final single from the album, when it officially impacted US adult contemporary radio on January 22, 2018, and contemporary hit radio on January 23, 2018.

"Learn to Let Go" was released as the album's second promotional single on July 28, 2017. "Hymn" was released as the album's third promotional single on August 3, 2017, and was the only song out of the previous three releases to not have an accompanying music video out at that time. The official music video for the song was released months later on May 31, 2018. The song went on to chart in Scotland and New Zealand (on the Heatseekers Chart), at 88 and 6, respectively.

== Critical reception ==
Professional ratings
Aggregate scores
Source	Rating
AnyDecentMusic?	7.7/10
Metacritic	81/100
Review scores
Source	Rating
AllMusic	4/5 stars
The A.V. Club	B+
Consequence of Sound	B
Entertainment Weekly	A−
The Guardian	4/5 stars
NME	4/5 stars
Paste	9.0/10
Pitchfork	6.8/10
Rolling Stone	4/5 stars
Slant Magazine	3.5/5 stars

Rainbow received widespread acclaim from music critics. At Metacritic, which assigns a normalized rating out of 100 to reviews from mainstream critics, the album has an average score of 81 out of 100, which indicates "universal acclaim" based on 27 reviews. Katie Baillie of Metro, who reviewed Rainbow a month before its release, called it a "powerful, emotional and strongly feminist record that is worth the four-year wait." She wrote that the "vulnerability of some songs will bring a tear to your eye, while others are so close to Kesha's old sound it'll have dance floors filled everywhere in no time." She described the album as "a roller coaster of emotions, making you weep at the sadness of 'Rainbow' and fist-pumping the air with 'Woman', and it was so worth the wait."

Andrew Uterberger of Billboard complimented Kesha's ability to make every song on the album sound different as well as differentiate herself from the electropop sound of her first two albums, stating that "it all works" and writing: "Kesha has the swagger for neo-glam, the grit for old-school soul, the pipes for power-balladry – listening to some of the spine-shivering feats she accomplishes on 'Praying', it's practically unthinkable that she was mostly consigned to sing-speaking her way through the majority of her musical career. And she's not even half done: Before the end of Rainbow, the singer formerly known as K-Money will have sauntered her way through train-chugging, Johnny Cash-via-Kacey Musgraves country ('Hunt You Down'), schlocky frat rock ('Boogie Feet') and quirky singer-songwriter parables ('Godzilla'). And the only arguable stumble in the bunch comes with the stomping 'Boots', which pairs the taunting wordplay of Kesha 1.0 ("If you can't handle these claws/ You don't get this kitty) with an electro-folk stomp that feels like a lukewarm version of Miley Cyrus' Bangerz."

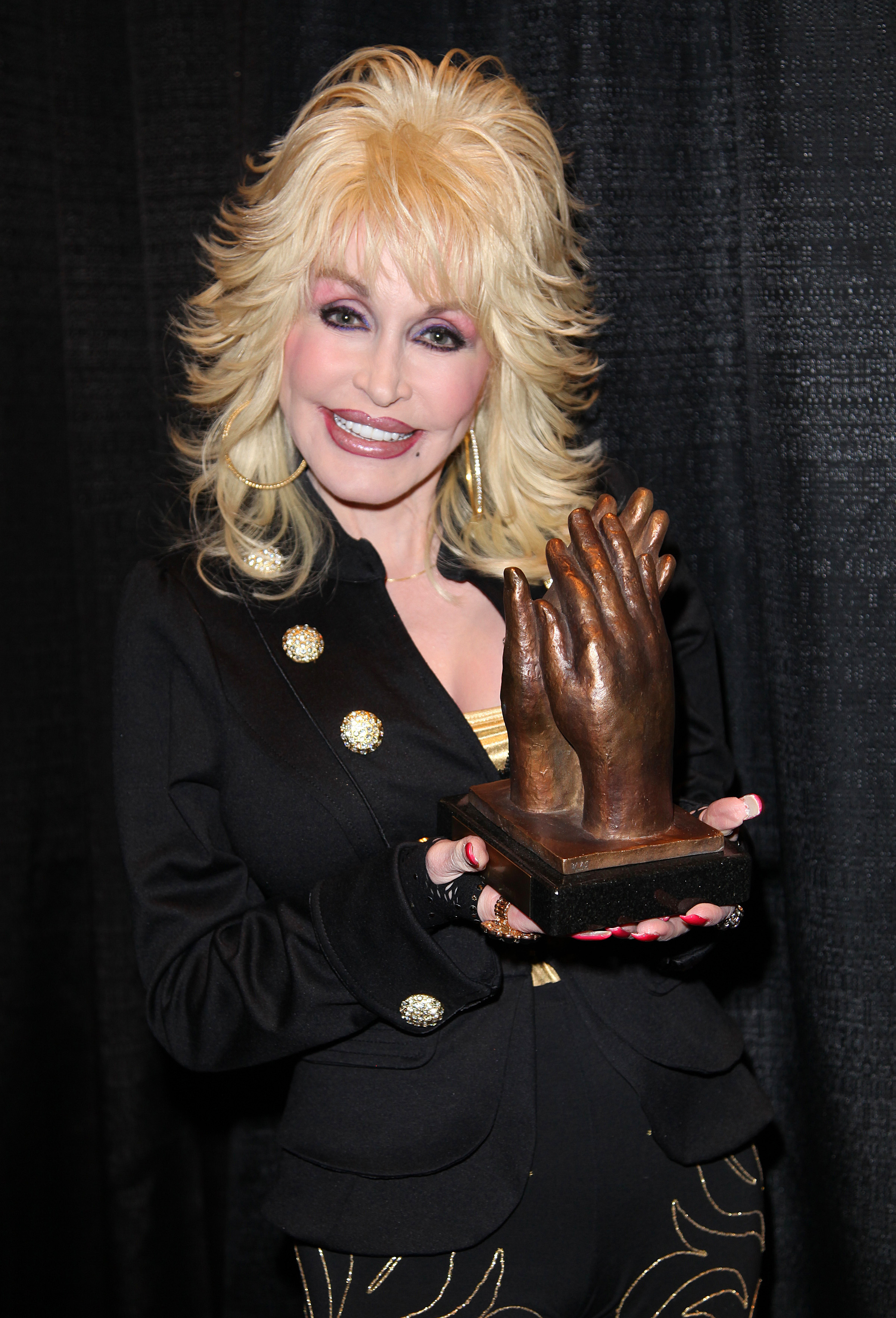
Kesha's cover of Dolly Parton's "Old Flames Can't Hold a Candle to You", featuring guest vocals from Parton herself (pictured), was hailed by one critic as Rainbow's most powerful moment.

Brittany Spanos of Rolling Stone gave Rainbow four stars out of a possible five and wrote: "On her excellent comeback record, Rainbow, Kesha channels that drama into the best music of her career – finding common ground between the honky-tonks she loves (her mom is Nashville songwriter Pebe Sebert) and the dance clubs she ruled with hits like 'Tik Tok' and 'Die Young', between glossy beats, epic ballads and grimy guitar riffs. In the process, she also finds her own voice: a freshly empowered, fearlessly feminist Top 40 rebel." Spanos also noted the noticeable departure from the electropop sound of Kesha's first two albums, writing, "Kesha used to sing about partying with rich dudes and feeling like P. Diddy. Rainbow is full of sympathetic (if at times cloying) prisoner metaphors and therapist clichés [...] Across the board, she achieves a careful balance of her diverse musical selves: The gospel-tinged 'Praying' takes the high road by wishing the best to the people who have hurt her, and 'Woman' is a blissfully irreverent, proudly self-sufficient retro-soul shouter backed by Brooklyn funk crew the Dap-Kings." She also stated that the album's "most powerful moment" is the singer's cover of Dolly Parton's "Old Flames Can't Hold a Candle to You", saying, "Parton herself helps out on guest vocals. But this isn't some Grand Ole Opry homage. Kesha flips and filters it through her dreamy vision, turning the sweet tune into rousing rockabilly until the standard sounds refreshed and vividly modern, battle-tested and born again. Just like the woman singing it."

Katherine Flynn of Consequence of Sound complimented Kesha's ability to retain her uniqueness on the record and stated that the album "feels much more organic" than her previous work, writing: "Rainbow, as a comprehensive work, feels much more organic and of this earth than anything by dollar-sign Ke$ha. There's a strong, organic rock and country influence that places her much more firmly in a lineage, a tradition, instead of the weird, airless, EDM-influenced vacuum that she inhabited on songs like the title track of 2012's Warrior and hits like 'Blow'." In an equally favorable review, Hilary Weaver of Vanity Fair described Rainbow as "a blatant, angry response to the singer's battle with a legal system that has left her feeling frustrated and trapped as an artist—but also a powerful pop album that earns the anticipation", writing: "This is an unapologetically open and honest Kesha we have never heard before—her voice is still recognizable but not as poppy and more focused with a message she wants her audience to hear loud and clear. She seems to come closest to directly referencing Dr. Luke once, as 'the boogeyman under [her] bed' in 'Letting Go'; the album is a more general, vocal proclamation against anyone who has wronged her in the past. This is Kesha's story, but it’s also the response that any woman in the Trump era of locker room talk might want to blast in her car on a particularly frustrating day." She also described Kesha as being in a "far different place than when her last album was released", calling her a "symbol of women standing up against patriarchal forces keeping them down" and writing: "It lends an automatic weight to Rainbow that Ke$ha might not have been able to shoulder—but Kesha, at least as she appears on this album, is up to the challenge."

In a more mixed review, Chris Willman of Variety stated that Kesha seems "stuck between a rock and a hard place" on Rainbow, writing: "For a while, anyway, it seems that a better title for this album than Rainbow would have been Warrior (except she used that one on her previous record). It would be nice to report that the songs addressing the distress of the last few years reveal her as a great confessional singer/songwriter, but the clunkiness of her most sober material here blunts its impact. Her most angry/inspirational tracks, like 'Don't Let the Bastards Get You Down', 'Learn to Let Go', and 'Praying', suffer not from seriousness but relative artlessness as Kesha unleashes a stream of Deepak-ian self-help bromides (embellished with plenty of Tupac-ian language) that'd sound better as bathroom-mirror sticky-note affirmations than they do as gospel-choir-backed lyrics." He also negatively compared Kesha to Pink and the Dixie Chicks on the album, writing: "The moment for some kind of personal revelation is nigh, but all these pop-psych clichés leave you feeling you know less about the real Kesha than you did coming in." Willman also lamented that the moments where Kesha expresses glimpses of her previous electropop "ridiculousness" on the album "[feel] refreshing and, just maybe, even more authentic. Not that you'd want her to push past her pain prematurely, but when it comes to the writing part, Kesha just happens to still be cleverer at playing koo-koo than guru."

=== Accolades ===
Rainbow appeared on several publications' year-end lists for 2017, as well as decade-end lists.

Select rankings of Rainbow on year-end lists
Publication	List	Rank	Ref.
AXS	10 Best Pop Albums of 2017	4	
Cosmopolitan	The 10 Best Albums of 2017	3	
NPR	The 50 Best Albums of 2017	8	
People	10 Best Albums of 2017	4	
PopSugar	The Best Albums of 2017, According to Us	1	
Rolling Stone	20 Best Pop Albums of 2017	2	
Rolling Stone	50 Best Albums of 2017	4	
Time	The Top 10 Albums of 2017	7	
Yahoo! Music	The Best Albums of 2017: Yahoo Entertainment Staff Picks	9	

Decade-end lists
Publication	List	Rank	Ref.
Billboard	The 100 Greatest Albums of the 2010s: Staff Picks	73	
Rolling Stone	The 100 Best Albums of the 2010s	79	

== Commercial performance ==
In the United States, Rainbow debuted at number one on the Billboard 200 with 117,000 album-equivalent units, which consisted of 90,000 pure album sales. It became her second number-one album in the country after Animal (2010). In 2024, the album was certified Platinum by the Recording Industry Association of America (RIAA), denoting sales of 1 million album-equivalent units.

== Awards and nominations ==
Kesha received two nominations at the 60th Annual Grammy Awards in 2018, including Best Pop Vocal Album and Best Pop Solo Performance for "Praying". These are Kesha's first set of Grammy nominations.

== Track listing ==
No.	Title	Writer(s)	Producer(s)	Length
1.	"Bastards"	Kesha Sebert	Ricky Reed; Drew Pearson^{[a]}; Nate Mercereau^{[b]}	3:51
2.	"Let 'Em Talk" (featuring Eagles of Death Metal)	K. Sebert; James Newman; Stuart Crichton	K. Sebert; Crichton	3:05
3.	"Woman" (featuring the Dap-Kings Horns)	K. Sebert; Pearson; Stephen Wrabel	Brody Brown; Pearson^{[a]}	3:16
4.	"Hymn"	K. Sebert; Cara Salimando; Eric Frederic; Jonny Price; Pebe Sebert	Ricky Reed; Price	3:25
5.	"Praying"	K. Sebert; Ryan Lewis; Andrew Joslyn; Ben Abraham	Lewis; Jon Castelli^{[b]}	3:50
6.	"Learn to Let Go"	K. Sebert; Crichton; P. Sebert	Reed; Crichton	3:37
7.	"Finding You"	K. Sebert; Frederic; Justin Tranter	Reed	2:52
8.	"Rainbow"	K. Sebert	Ben Folds; Rob Moose^{[b]}	3:38
9.	"Hunt You Down"	K. Sebert; Richard Nowels	Nowels	3:17
10.	"Boogie Feet" (featuring Eagles of Death Metal)	K. Sebert; Pearson; P. Sebert	Pearson	2:53
11.	"Boots"	K. Sebert; Frederic; Rogét Chahayed; Tranter	Reed; Mercereau^{[c]}; Chahayed^{[c]}	3:03
12.	"Old Flames (Can't Hold a Candle to You)" (featuring Dolly Parton)	Hugh Moffatt; P. Sebert	K. Sebert^{[a]}; P. Sebert; Pearson^{[d]}	4:26
13.	"Godzilla"	P. Sebert; Claire Wilkinson; Nathan Chapman	Reed; Pearson^{[a]}	2:08
14.	"Spaceship"	K. Sebert; Pearson; P. Sebert	Pearson^{[a]}	5:15
Total length:				48:36

Japanese CD bonus track
No.	Title	Writer(s)	Producer(s)	Length
15.	"Emotional"	K. Sebert; Wrabel	Pearson	3:44
Total length:				52:20

Notes

- ^{^[a]} signifies a primary and vocal producer
- ^{^[b]} signifies an additional producer
- ^{^[c]} signifies a co-producer
- ^{^[d]} signifies a vocal producer

== Personnel ==
Credits adapted from Tidal.

Musicians

- Kesha – lead vocals (all tracks), background vocals (2, 6)
- Nate Mercereau – guitar (1, 11)
- Drew Pearson – guitar (1, 3), keyboard (3, 13), piano (3, 13, 14), programming (3, 13), banjo (14), bass guitar (14)
- Ricky Reed – bass (1), drums (1, 6), guitar (1, 4), programming (4, 11, 13), güiro (6), keyboard (13), piano (13)
- Dave Catching – guitar (2, 10)
- Stuart Crichton – background vocals (2, 6), programming (2)
- Eagles of Death Metal – background vocals (2, 10)
- Jesse Hughes – vocals, guitar (2, 10)
- Matt McJunkins – bass guitar (2, 10)
- Jorma Vik – drums (2, 10)
- Dave Guy – trumpet (3)
- Cochemea Gastelum – baritone saxophone (3)
- Neal Sugarman – tenor saxophone (3)
- Saundra Williams – background vocals (3)
- Nick Annis – guitar (4)
- Jonny Price – programming (4)
- Heather Borror – violin (5)
- Rebecca Chung-Filice – cello (5)
- Hannah Crofts – background vocals (5)
- Christopher Foerstel – viola (5)
- Andrew Joslyn – strings, violin (5)
- Andrew Kamman – violin (5)
- Sarah Malmstrom – violin (5)
- Seth May-Patterson – viola (5)
- Georgia Mooney – background vocals (5)
- Garrett Overcash – violin (5)
- Eli Weinberger – cello (5)
- Katherine Wighton – background vocals (5)
- Pebe Sebert – background vocals (6, 10, 14)
- Ben Bram – background vocals (8)
- Gabriel Cabezas – cello (8)
- Kenton Chen – background vocals (8)
- Katie Faraudo – French horn (8)
- Ben Folds – bass guitar, celesta, percussion, piano, timpani (8)
- Faithful Central Bible Church Choir – choir (8)
- Ira Glansbeek – cello (8)
- Ryan Lerman – background vocals (8)
- Theo Katzman – percussion (8)
- Rob Moose – violin (8)
- Alex Sopp – flute (8)
- Lara Wickes – oboe (8)
- Danielle Withers – background vocals (8)
- Spencer Cullum – guitar (9, 12, 14)
- Robbie Crowell – keyboard (9, 12)
- Jon Estes – bass guitar (9, 12)
- Gary Ferguson – drums (9)
- David Levitt – electric guitar (9)
- Rick Nowels – organ (9)
- Tim Pierce – guitar (9)
- Rogét Chahayed – piano, programming (11)
- Jeremy Fetzer – guitar (12)
- Ian Fitchuk – drums (12)
- Tom Peyton – horn (13)
- Ramage Jacobs – mandolin (14)

Technical

- Drew Pearson – engineer (1, 13, 14), recording engineer (3, 10)
- Ethan Shumaker – engineer (1, 4, 6, 7, 13)
- Sergio Chávez – engineer (2)
- Fareed Salamah – engineer (3)
- Justin Armstrong – engineer (5)
- Billy Centenaro – engineer (5)
- Antonia Gauci – engineer (5)
- Joe Costa – engineer (8)
- Dave Way – engineer (8)
- Ingmar Carlson – engineer (10, 14), assistant engineer (2, 5)
- Bobby Holland – engineer (14)
- Manny Marroquin – mixing engineer (1, 3, 4, 6, 7, 11, 13)
- Chris Galland – mixing engineer (1, 3, 4, 6, 7, 11, 13)
- Jon Castelli – mixing engineer (2, 5, 10)
- David Boucher – mixing engineer (8)
- Shawn Everett – mixing engineer (9)
- Kieron Menzies – mixing engineer (9)
- Chris Garcia – mixing engineer (9)
- Dean Reid – mixing engineer (9)
- Michael Stankiewicz – mixing engineer (9), recording engineer (12)
- Trevor Yasuda – mixing engineer (9)
- Chuck Ainlay – mixing engineer (12)
- Stuart Crichton – recording engineer (2, 6), engineer (6)
- Kevin Estrada – recording engineer (10)
- Robin Florent – assistant engineer (1, 3, 4, 6, 7, 11, 13)
- Jeff Jackson – assistant engineer (1, 3, 4, 6, 7, 11, 13)
- Ryan Nasci – assistant engineer (2, 5, 10, 14)
- Matt Dyson – assistant engineer (8)
- Jeff Gartenbaum – assistant engineer (8)
- Charlie Paakkari – assistant engineer (8)
- Zack Pancoast – assistant engineer (9, 12)
- Ivan Wayman – assistant engineer (9)

Design

- Robert Beatty – artwork
- Olivia Bee – photography
- Erwin Gorostiza – creative director
- Brian Roettinger – art direction

== Charts ==
=== Weekly charts ===
Weekly chart performance for Rainbow
Chart (2017)	Peak position
Australian Albums (ARIA)	3
Austrian Albums (Ö3 Austria)	16
Belgian Albums (Ultratop Flanders)	17
Belgian Albums (Ultratop Wallonia)	56
Canadian Albums (Billboard)	1
Czech Albums (ČNS IFPI)	55
Dutch Albums (Album Top 100)	10
Finnish Albums (Suomen virallinen lista)	26
French Albums (SNEP)	62
German Albums (Offizielle Top 100)	33
Irish Albums (IRMA)	2
Italian Albums (FIMI)	39
Japanese Hot Albums (Billboard)	90
Japanese Albums (Oricon)	42
Japanese International Albums (Oricon)	7
New Zealand Albums (RMNZ)	4
Norwegian Albums (VG-lista)	13
Polish Albums (ZPAV)	28
Scottish Albums (Official Charts)	4
South Korean Albums (Circle)	66
South Korean International Albums (Circle)	3
Spanish Albums (Promusicae)	7
Swedish Albums (Sverigetopplistan)	25
Swiss Albums (Romandie)	10
Swiss Albums (Schweizer Hitparade)	14
Taiwanese Albums (Five Music)	2
UK Albums (Official Charts)	4
US Billboard 200	1
US Indie Store Album Sales (Billboard)	3
US Vinyl Albums (Billboard)	4

=== Year-end charts ===
Year-end chart performance for Rainbow
Chart (2017)	Position
US Billboard 200	115

== Certifications ==
Certifications for Rainbow
Region	Certification	Certified units/sales
Canada (Music Canada)	Gold	40,000^{‡}
New Zealand (RMNZ)	Gold	7,500^{‡}
United States (RIAA)	Platinum	1,000,000^{‡}
^{‡} Sales+streaming figures based on certification alone.

== Release history ==
List of regions, release dates, showing formats, label, editions and references
Region	Date	Format(s)	Label	Edition(s)	Ref.
Various	August 11, 2017	CD; LP; digital download; streaming	Kemosabe; RCA	Explicit; clean	
Japan	August 16, 2017	CD	Sony	Bonus track	
Brazil	September 6, 2017	CD	Sony	Explicit	

== Film ==
A music documentary titled Kesha: Rainbow – The Film, produced by Apple Music and Magic Seed Productions, was announced on July 30, 2018. The 31-minute documentary features 8 songs from the album and chronicles Kesha's recording process up to her performance at the 2018 Grammy Awards. The Metrograph in New York City hosted three screenings on August 3, 2018, and the film became available on demand for Apple Music subscribers on August 10, 2018. The film won Best Online Music Film at the 2019 Webby Awards.

== See also ==
- List of 2017 albums
- List of Billboard 200 number-one albums of 2017
- List of number-one albums of 2017 (Canada)
- List of UK top-ten albums in 2017
