= Rainbow Tour =

Rainbow Tour may refer to:

- An event in the life of Eva Perón
- "Rainbow Tour", a song in the musical Evita
- Rainbow World Tour, a worldwide arena concert tour in 2000 by Mariah Carey
- Rainbow Tour (Kesha), 2017–2018 world tour by Kesha
- Rainbow Tour 2009, by Miho Fukuhara
