= Rainbow Tour (Kesha) =

2017–19 concert tour by Kesha

- Tour by Kesha
- Location: Asia; Europe; North America; Oceania
- Associated album: Rainbow
- Start date: September 26, 2017
- End date: November 16, 2019
- Legs: 4
- No. of shows: 53

Kesha concert chronology
- Kesha and the Creepies: Fuck the World Tour (2016–17); Rainbow Tour (2017–19); The Adventures of Kesha and Macklemore (2018)

The Rainbow Tour is the fourth headlining concert tour by American singer Kesha, in support of her third studio album Rainbow (2017). It was her first solo tour since the Warrior Tour in 2013. The tour started in Birmingham on September 26, 2017, and ended on November 16, 2019. Tickets ranged from $42 to $2,484 on the secondary ticket market.

== Background and development ==
Since 2014, Kesha has been involved in a legal battle against her former producer and longtime collaborator Dr. Luke. This legal dispute has put her career on hold. To reconnect with her fans, Kesha embarked on the Kesha and the Creepies: Fuck the World Tour, which took place in North America and Asia between 2016 and 2017. In October 2016, it was revealed that Kesha has written and given to her label 22 new songs.

On July 6, 2017, the lead single "Praying" from Rainbow was released. On August 1, four days prior the release of her album, Kesha announced the tour, revealing tour dates in North America. Shows in Europe, Oceania and Asia were later added.

On February 20, 2018, Kesha announced that her planned shows in Australia, New Zealand, Taiwan and Japan are temporarily canceled and will be rescheduled due to an imminent knee surgery in order to repair her torn ACL. On March 23, 2018, Kesha announced the rescheduled dates in Australia and Asia, set to take place in October. She rescheduled the shows in Adelaide, Melbourne, Sydney, and Brisbane, and cancelled the shows in Perth and Auckland, New Zealand. She was also scheduled to perform at Bluefest in Byron Bay in March, but that date was also cancelled. Kesha later added shows in South Korea and China, as well as a festival date in Japan. Unfortunately, since Kesha had not yet acclimatized to the food and weather, she had to cancel the already rescheduled Taipei show 20 minutes before she was due to take the stage, as well as cancelling the entirety of her four date China tour. Kesha's official site says that the show in Chengdu, China is postponed and not cancelled, but it is unknown if the show will be rescheduled.

== Set list ==
This set list is from the show on September 27, 2017 in Nashville. It is not intended to represent all concerts for the tour.

1. "Woman"
2. "Boogie Feet"
3. "Learn to Let Go"
4. "Hymn"
5. "Let 'Em Talk"
6. "Take It Off"
7. "We R Who We R"
8. "Spaceship"
9. "Hunt You Down" / "Timber"
10. "Godzilla"
11. "Your Love Is My Drug"
12. "Blow"
13. "Praying"

Encore

14. "Rainbow"
15. "Tik Tok"
16. "Bastards"

== Tour dates ==
| Date | City | Country | Venue | Attendance | Revenue |
North America
| September 26, 2017 | Birmingham | United States | Iron City | 1,300 / 1,300 (100%) | $50,050 |
| September 27, 2017 | Nashville | United States | Ryman Auditorium | 2,168 / 2,362 | $93,845 |
| September 29, 2017 | Atlanta | United States | Coca-Cola Roxy | 3,039 / 3,039 | $84,030 |
| September 30, 2017 | Charlotte | United States | The Fillmore Charlotte | 2,001 / 2,001 | $63,833 |
| October 2, 2017 | Raleigh | United States | The Ritz | —N/a | —N/a |
| October 4, 2017 | Boston | United States | House of Blues | —N/a | —N/a |
| October 6, 2017 | Silver Spring | United States | The Fillmore Silver Spring | —N/a | —N/a |
| October 7, 2017 | Philadelphia | United States | The Fillmore | —N/a | —N/a |
| October 9, 2017 | New York City | United States | Hammerstein Ballroom | 2,200 / 2,200 | $99,937 |
| October 10, 2017 | New York City | United States | Irving Plaza | 1,029 / 1,029 | $93,272 |
| October 13, 2017 | Lakewood | United States | Lakewood Civic Auditorium | —N/a | —N/a |
| October 15, 2017 | Detroit | United States | The Fillmore Detroit | —N/a | —N/a |
| October 16, 2017 | Toronto | Canada | Rebel | 2,500 / 2,500 | $120,000 |
| October 18, 2017 | Chicago | United States | Aragon Ballroom | —N/a | —N/a |
| October 19, 2017 | Milwaukee | United States | The Rave/Eagles Club | —N/a | —N/a |
| October 23, 2017 | Kansas City | United States | Uptown Theater | —N/a | —N/a |
| October 24, 2017 | Denver | United States | Fillmore Auditorium | —N/a | —N/a |
| October 27, 2017 | Seattle | United States | Showbox SoDo | —N/a | —N/a |
| October 28, 2017 | Portland | United States | Roseland Theater | —N/a | —N/a |
| October 31, 2017 | San Francisco | United States | SF Masonic Auditorium | —N/a | —N/a |
| November 1, 2017 | Los Angeles | United States | Hollywood Palladium | —N/a | —N/a |
Europe
| November 14, 2017 | London | England | Electric Brixton | —N/a | —N/a |
Asia
| February 9, 2018 | Dubai | United Arab Emirates | Dubai Media City Amphitheatre | —N/a | —N/a |
North America
| June 29, 2018 | Sioux City | United States | Hard Rock Hotel & Casino | —N/a | —N/a |
| June 30, 2018 | Prior Lake | United States | Mystic Showroom | —N/a | —N/a |
| July 2, 2018 | Oklahoma City | United States | OKC Zoo Amphitheatre | —N/a | —N/a |
| July 4, 2018 | Milwaukee | United States | Henry Maier Festival Park | —N/a | —N/a |
| July 6, 2018 | Grand Rapids | United States | Van Andel Arena | —N/a | —N/a |
| July 7, 2018 (Note: The show on July 7, 2018 in Des Moines at Western Gateway Park is part of the 80/35 Music Festival.) | Des Moines | United States | Western Gateway Park | —N/a | —N/a |
| August 7, 2018 | Bethlehem | United States | Musikfest | —N/a | —N/a |
Asia
| September 14, 2018 | Seoul | South Korea | Yonsei University Amphitheatre | 4,038 / 5,000 | —N/a |
| September 29, 2018 (Note: The show on September 29, 2018 in Okinawa at the Camp Hansen Parade Deck is part of the Hansen Festival) | Okinawa | Japan | Camp Hansen Parade Deck | —N/a | —N/a |
| October 1, 2018 (Note: The show on October 1, 2018 in Tokyo at Zepp Tokyo was originally scheduled to take place on April 17, but was temporarily canceled and then rescheduled due to knee surgery.) | Tokyo | Japan | Zepp Tokyo | —N/a | —N/a |
| October 2, 2018 (Note: The show on October 2, 2018 in Tokyo at Zepp Diver City was originally scheduled to take place on April 19 at Zepp Tokyo, but was temporarily canceled and then rescheduled due to knee surgery.) | Tokyo | Japan | Zepp Diver City | —N/a | —N/a |
| October 4, 2018 (Note: The show on October 4, 2018 in Osaka at Zepp Namba was originally scheduled to take place on April 20, 2018, but was temporarily canceled and then rescheduled due to knee surgery.) | Osaka | Japan | Zepp Namba | —N/a | —N/a |
Oceania
| October 7, 2018 (Note: The show on October 7, 2018 in Melbourne at Margaret Court Arena was originally scheduled to take place on April 5, 2018, but was temporarily canceled and then rescheduled due to knee surgery.) | Melbourne | Australia | Margaret Court Arena | —N/a | —N/a |
| October 8, 2018 (Note: The show on October 8, 2018 in Adelaide at Thebarton Theatre was originally scheduled to take place on April 4, 2018, but was temporarily canceled and then rescheduled due to knee surgery.) | Adelaide | Australia | Thebarton Theatre | —N/a | —N/a |
| October 10, 2018 (Note: The show on October 10, 2018 in Brisbane at Eatons Hill Hotel was originally scheduled to take place on March 25, 2018, but was temporarily canceled and then rescheduled due to knee surgery.) | Brisbane | Australia | Eatons Hill Hotel | —N/a | —N/a |
| October 11, 2018 (Note: The show on October 11, 2018 in Sydney at ICC Sydney Theatre was originally scheduled to take place on March 31, 2018, but was temporarily canceled and then rescheduled due to knee surgery.) | Sydney | Australia | ICC Sydney Theatre | —N/a | —N/a |
North America
| November 2, 2018 (Note: The show on November 2, 2018 was a free concert to celebrate the 30th anniversary of U.S. Cellular offering wireless service in Cedar Rapids.) | Cedar Rapids | United States | U.S. Cellular Center | —N/a | —N/a |
| November 3, 2018 (Note: The show on November 3, 2018 was renamed "Stronger Than Hate" following a terrorist attack at a synagogue.) | Pittsburgh | United States | Downtown Pittsburgh | —N/a | —N/a |
| November 16, 2018 (Note: The show on November 16, 2018 was co-headlined with The Struts.) | Atlantic City | United States | Ocean Ovation Hall | —N/a | —N/a |
| December 31, 2018 | Uncasville | United States | Mohegan Sun Arena | —N/a | —N/a |
| March 29, 2019 | Boone | United States | Appalachian State University | —N/a | —N/a |
| April 26, 2019 | Tulsa | United States | River Spirit Casino Resort | —N/a | —N/a |
| April 27, 2019 (Note: The show on April 27, 2019 was part of the Springtime of Youth Festival.) | Fayetteville | United States | Washington County Fairgrounds | —N/a | —N/a |
| May 16, 2019 (Note: The show on May 16, 2019 is part of the MusiCares Concert for Recovery honoring Macklemore.) | Los Angeles | United States | The Novo | —N/a | —N/a |
| June 1, 2019 (Note: The show on June 1, 2019 is part of the Anniversary Party of Greenwich International Film Festival.) | Port Chester | United States | Capitol Theatre | —N/a | —N/a |
| June 27, 2019 | Funner | United States | Harrah's Resort SoCal | —N/a | —N/a |
| June 29, 2019 (Note: The show on June 29, 2019 is part of the LoveLoud 2019 Festival.) | West Valley City | United States | USANA Amphitheatre | —N/a | —N/a |
| September 5, 2019 | Prior Lake | United States | Mystic Showroom | —N/a | —N/a |
| September 6, 2019 (Note: The show on September 6, 2019 is part of University of Wisconsin-Milwaukee's Pantherfest.) | Milwaukee | United States | BMO Harris Pavilion | —N/a | —N/a |
| September 8, 2019 | Highland Park | United States | Ravinia Pavilion | —N/a | —N/a |
| November 16, 2019 (Note: The show on November 16, 2019 is part of the Rock 'N' Roll Marathon Series.) | Las Vegas | United States | Las Vegas Convention Center | —N/a | —N/a |
| Total | | | | 18,275 / 19,431 (94%) | $604,967 |

== Cancelled shows ==
List of cancelled concerts, showing date, city, country, venue and reason for cancellation
| Date | City | Country | Venue | Reason | |
|---|---|---|---|---|---|
| October 25, 2017 | Salt Lake City | United States | The Complex | Injury | |
| March 27, 2018 (Note: The show on March 27, 2018 in Perth at Metro City was originally scheduled to take place on March 26, 2018.) | Perth | Australia | Metro City | Knee surgery | |
| March 29, 2018 (Note: The show on March 29, 2018 in Byron Bay at Byron Bay Area would have been part of the Byron Bay Bluesfest festival.) | Byron Bay | Australia | Byron Bay Area | Knee surgery | |
| April 2, 2018 | Auckland | New Zealand | The Trusts Arena | Knee surgery | Unknown |
| September 16, 2018 (Note: The show on September 16, 2018 in Taipei at Nangang C3 Field was originally scheduled to take place on April 8, 2018, but was temporarily canceled and then rescheduled due to knee surgery.) | Taipei | Taiwan | National Taiwan University Sports Center | Canceled 20 minutes before showtime due to weather conditions | |
| September 19, 2018 | Nanjing | China | Wutaishan Stadium | Unknown | |
| September 21, 2018 | Beijing | China | Workers' Stadium | Unknown | |
| September 23, 2018 | Chengdu | China | Chengdu Cube Magic Performance Center | Unknown | |
| September 26, 2018 | Shenzhen | China | Shenzhen Universiade Arena | Unknown | |
