= Makeovers: Crew Better Work =

- RuPaul's Drag Race episode
- Episode no.: Season 9 Episode 10
- Presented by: RuPaul
- Original air date: May 26, 2017

Guest appearances
- Kesha; Zaldy

Episode chronology
← Previous "Your Pilot's on Fire"	Next → "Gayest Ball Ever"
- RuPaul's Drag Race season 9

"Makeovers: Crew Better Work" is the tenth episode of the ninth season of the American television series RuPaul's Drag Race. It originally aired on May 26, 2017. The episode's main challenge tasks the contestants with giving makeovers to members of the show's production crew. American singer Kesha and American fashion designer Zaldy are guest judges.

Trinity Taylor wins the episode's main challenge. Nina Bo'nina Brown is eliminated from the competition, after placing in the bottom two and losing a lip-sync contest against Shea Couleé to "Cool for the Summer" by Demi Lovato.

== Episode ==
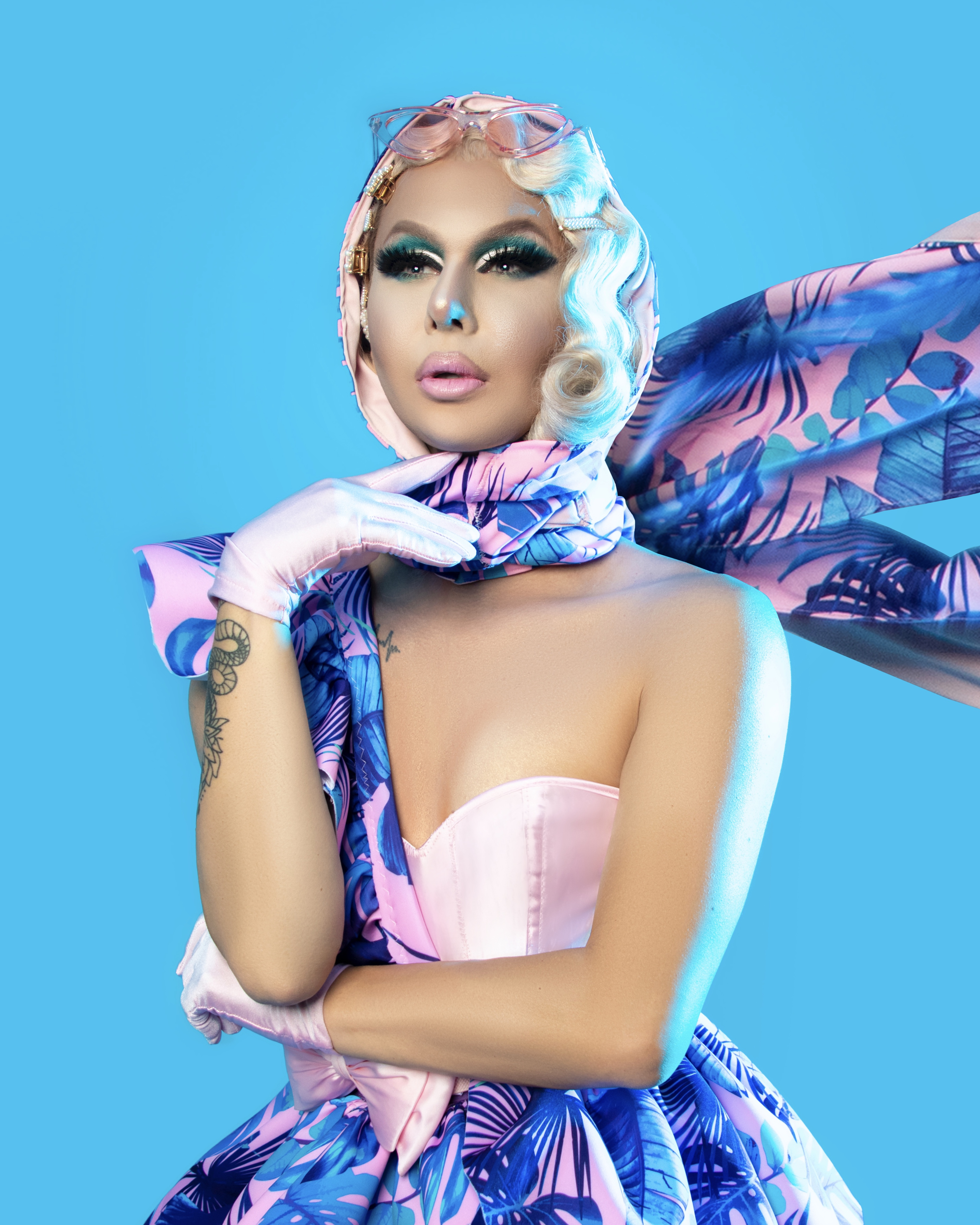
Trinity Taylor (pictured in 2020) wins the episode's main challenge.

The contestants return to the Werk Room after Valentina's elimination on the previous episode. On a new day, RuPaul greets the group and reveals the main challenge, which tasks the contestants with giving makeovers to members of the show's production crew. As the winners of the last main challenge, Sasha Velour and Shea Couleé get to decide the pairs. The teams begin to brainstorm, prepare their looks, and rehearse. RuPaul returns to meet with each pair, asking questions and offering advice. Before leaving, RuPaul shares that the pairs will be performing to the song "Click Clack".

On elimination day, the pairs make final preparations in the Werk Room for the fashion show. Nina Bo'nina Brown talks about her struggle with depression. On the main stage, RuPaul welcomes fellow judges Michelle Visage and Ross Mathews, as well as guest judges Kesha and Zaldy. The fashion show commences, then the pairs dance to "Click Clack".

The judges deliver their critiques, deliberate, then share the results with the group. Sasha Velour and Trinity Taylor receive positive critiques, and Trinity Taylor wins the challenge. Alexis Michelle, Nina Bo'nina Brown, and Shea Couleé receive negative critiques, and Alexis Michelle is deemed safe. Nina Bo'nina Brown and Shea Couleé place in the bottom and face off in a lip-sync contest to "Cool for the Summer" (2015) by Demi Lovato. Shea Couleé wins the lip-sync and Nina Bo'nina Brown is eliminated from the competition.

== Production and broadcast ==
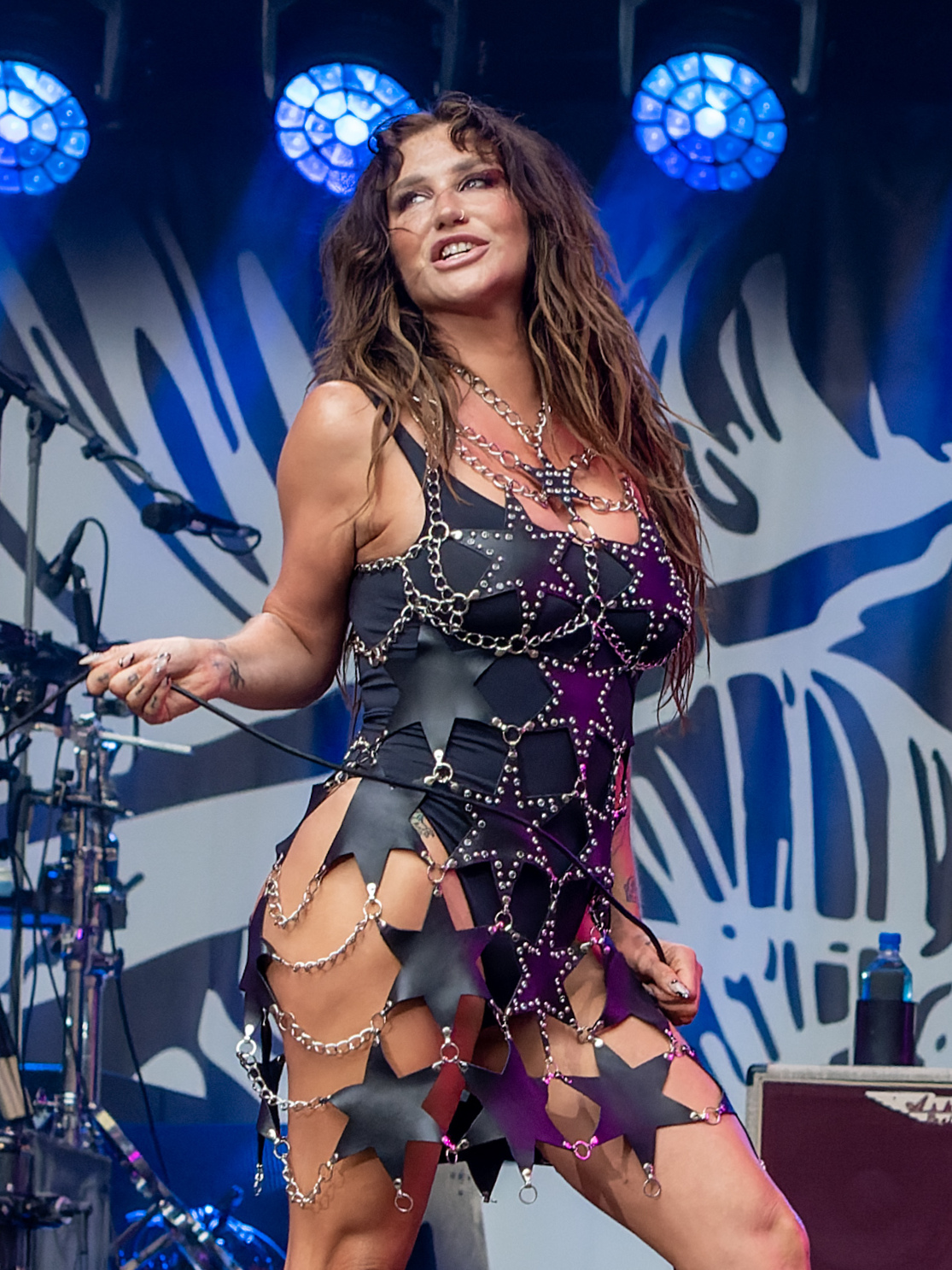
Kesha is a guest judge.

The episode originally aired on May 26, 2017.

Nina Bo'nina Brown said she "checked out" during the lip-sync contest.

Peppermint's partner Winter Green made another appearance on the season finale and on the thirteenth season.

=== Fashion ===
For the main stage, RuPaul wears a Zaldy-designed dress with some of RuPaul's catch phrases in Japanese. For the fashion show, the contestants are tasked with presenting looks with a "family resemblance". Trinity Taylor and Glittafa Dayze have matching outfits with a cheetah print. Shea Couleé and Bae Couleé have black-and-white outfits. The former has a pink wig and the latter has a blue wig. Alexis Michelle and Rye Anne Stardust have matching white boots and headbands. The former has a blue wig and the latter has a light purple wig. Nina Bo'nina Brown and Ariana Bo'nina Brown have rabbit-inspired black outfits. Both have prosthetics and cosmetics to give an animal-like appearance, as well as rabbit ears on the top of their heads. Sasha Velour and Dunatella Velour present outfits with similar patterns. Sasha Velour has "LO" on her back and Dunatella Velour has "LO" on her back. Initially, they spell out "LOVE", but then switch places so Sasha Velour can show a prop with "UR" to spell out "VELOUR". Peppermint and Winter Green have outfits with different patterns, long sleeves, and similar wigs.

== Reception ==
Oliver Sava of The A.V. Club gave the episode a rating of 'B+'. Writing for Vulture, Joel Kim Booster rated the episode four out of five stars. Streams of "Cool for the Summer" increased 199 percent after the show aired. Andy Swift of TVLine said of the lip-sync contest: "neither of the queens gave a particularly memorable performance; it was one of the most evenly matched/boring battles I've seen in a minute". Jason Fontelieu of The Diamondback said Nina Bo'nina Brown "basically handed" the contest to her competitor. Kevin O'Keeffe ranked the "Cool for the Summer" performance number 75 in INTO Magazine's "definitive ranking" of the show's lip-syncs to date. Sam Brooks ranked the contest number 92 in The Spinoff's 2019 "definitive ranking" of the show's 162 lip-syncs to date. In 2021, Matt Moen of Paper said, "you would be forgiven if you ended up repressing the memory of this performance", and opined: "It was frankly painful to watch as Nina just flat out gave up and barely went through the motions with withered moves and half-assed attempts at even getting the words... It's just a shame that a song that had as much potential as 'Cool for the Summer' was relegated to this lackluster display."

== See also ==
- Kesha videography
