= Stephen (song) =

2010 song by Kesha

Song by Kesha

from the album Animal
- Released: January 1, 2010
- Recorded: 2007
- Studio: ACME Recording (Long Island, California); Ollywood Studios (Hollywood, California)
- Genre: Dance-pop
- Length: 3:32
- Label: RCA
- Songwriters: Kesha Sebert; David Gamson; Pebe Sebert; Oliver Leiber
- Producers: David Gamson; Oliver Leiber

Music video
- "Stephen" on YouTube

"Stephen" is a song by American singer and songwriter Kesha, taken from her debut studio album, Animal (2010). The song was written by Kesha in collaboration with David Gamson, Pebe Sebert, and Oliver Leiber. It was produced by Gamson with additional production by Leiber. The song's instrumentation was by Gamson, with the exception of the accordion, which was played by Kesha. Kesha wrote the song about a boy that she had been stalking and who had refused to call the singer.

Musically, "Stephen" is a dance-pop ballad that incorporates elements of country music. The song received some positive reviews from music critics upon its release. After the release of Animal for download, "Stephen" charted on the lower regions of the South Korea Gaon International Chart. A music video for the song was released on the repackaging of the singer's debut album, Animal + Cannibal.

== Writing and inspiration ==
"Stephen" was written by Kesha Sebert, in collaboration with her mother Pebe Sebert, David Gamson, and Oliver Leiber. The song was produced by Gamson with additional production by Leiber. Gamson played all the instruments on the song, with the exception of the accordion, which was performed by Kesha. The song's recording was commenced at ACME Recording, Long Island, California, and at Ollywood Studios, Hollywood, California, by Gamson. Kesha told Rolling Stone that "Stephen" was one of her favorite tracks on the album. She explained that the song stemmed from her experiences with a man that she had been "stalking since [she] was 15." It was written when the singer was sixteen, in collaboration with her mother. She found David Gamson to produce the song. "He does all the keyboard stuff, he's amazing, a crazy cynical genius guy, and he liked my voice and my thing, and I really liked his thing, so we decided to work together" she explained.

Kesha was inspired to write the song after continual rejection from the protagonist in the song, Stephen, who refused to call the singer. She told MTV "I wrote [it] about this guy that I've been stalking since I was, like, 15, but he's a total loser, so I don't want to glorify him in any way, but I'm really excited for the song." In February 2010, after the release of the song, Stephen attended one of the singer's concerts. Speaking to Total Access on 96.4FM The Wave, the singer recalled the experience saying "he came to see my show at this huge gay bar in New York and it was totally off the chain. He gets up on stage, takes all his clothes off except his underwear and starts making out with a tranny. I was like, 'Wait a minute, have I been barking up the wrong genre of tree?'"

== Composition ==
"Stephen" is a dance-pop song with elements of country music. According to digital sheet music published at Musicnotes.com by Sony-ATV Music Publishing, the song is written in the key of D major and the tempo is 100 beats per minute, a moderately fast rate. Kesha's vocal range in the song spans from a low of E_{3} to a high of D_{5}. The lyrics begin with Kesha singing "Stephen, Stephen, why won't you call me?" The song's lyrics depict the singer stalking her then crush, Stephen, who ultimately would not call the singer. "Stephen" opens with layered a cappella and vocoder harmonies, later transitioning into a dominantly driven pop song. According to the singer, "Stephen" showcases her more vulnerable side and encompasses humor throughout its lyrics: "'Stephen' shows the vulnerable side of me but it's still a funny pop song. It's me saying I'm totally obsessive and in love with this guy, but he's blowing me off in a pretty funny way."

Fraser McAlpine of BBC called the song "a vulnerable ode to an unreliable crush." According to Andrew Burgess of MusicOMH, the song "tells the story of that one guy Ke$ha can't bag: 'What the hell? I can charm the pants off anyone else, but you.'" Ann Powers of the Los Angeles Times felt that the song was experimental, comparing it to the group Animal Collective.

== Critical reception ==
"Stephen" received positive comments from music critics. Fraser McAlpine of BBC Music used "Stephen" as an example of the songs on Animal that exemplified the singer's vocals, saying it had "beautiful layered a cappella harmonies. Sure, it tumbles into clunky pop straight afterwards, but then, that also seems to be what she does: beautiful things are bashed against ugly things, pretty melodies ruined by silly noises, emotional lyrics stuffed with buzzwords." Daniel Brockman of The Boston Phoenix wrote of the album that "in a post–'Birthday Sex' pop landscape, there's plenty of room for dumb if it's done well." He described "Stephen" as "an ode to forcing your sexual advances on your high-school history teacher." Ann Powers of the Los Angeles Times listed the song as one of those that exemplified the album's more experimental side, calling it a "country-in-space" rendition.

MusicOMH's writer Andrew Burgess wrote that "Stephen" is one of the album's "obligatory ballads", saying it is "fine". His conclusion regarding the album's ballads was that "Perhaps Ke$ha is, in fact, a more complex and multi-faceted party girl than she seems like on the surface." Digital Spy commented that the Kesha uses the album "to show her vulnerable side" and that "she admits she can't take rejection on the country-tinged 'Stephen'."

== Music video ==
A still from the music video showing Kesha getting in a verbal altercation with her inanimate dummy boyfriend.

A music video for "Stephen" was directed by the production team Skinny. The video was released on the deluxe repacking of her debut album, Animal, under its re-release entitled Animal + Cannibal. It was later uploaded to the singer's Vevo account on April 4, 2011. The video is composed of still shots that show the singer "going to some extreme lengths to show 'Stephen' how much she's feeling him." The video opens with the singer looking through a scrapbook; following this, the video depicts the singer's interactions with the protagonist. The video's first setting is a bar where the singer gets into a verbal altercation with the man's girlfriend. Kesha, who later leaves with the then unconscious man, takes him back to her house to take pictures of him and later cuts off some of his hair for her shrine. The singer then duct-tapes the man and locks him in her closet, which he later escapes from. Following this, the singer is distraught and builds another man out of a dummy, and using the hair she had clipped earlier, brings the dummy to a bar, getting into another altercation with it and later leaving it in the street – ending the video.

== Track listing ==
- Digital download
1. "Stephen" – 3:32

== Credits and personnel ==
Recording

- Recorded by David Gamson at ACME Recording, Long Island, California; and at Ollywood Studios, Hollywood, California.

Personnel

- Songwriting – Kesha Sebert, David Gamson, Pebe Sebert, Oliver Leiber
- Production – David Gamson, Oliver Leiber
- Instruments and programming – David Gamson
- Accordion – Kesha

Credits adapted from the liner notes of Animal, Kemosabe Recordings, via RCA Records.

== Charts ==
Upon the release of Animal, "Stephen" debuted and peaked at number at eighty-nine on the issue date of January 3, 2010, on the South Korea Gaon International Songs Chart. The song was the ninth highest debuting album track from its parent album.

Chart (2010)	Peak position
South Korea Gaon International Chart	89
