= Woman (Kesha song) =

Single by Kesha featuring the Dap-Kings Horns

from the album Rainbow
- Released: January 22, 2018
- Recorded: 2017
- Studio: Purple Dinosaur Studios; Westlake Recording Studios (Hollywood, CA)
- Genre: Funk-pop
- Length: 3:16
- Label: RCA; Kemosabe
- Songwriters: Andrew Pearson; Kesha Sebert; Stephen Wrabel
- Producers: Brody Brown; Pearson

Kesha singles chronology
"This Is Me" (2017)	"Woman" (2018)	"Body Talks" (2018)

Music video
- "Woman" on YouTube

"Woman" is a song recorded by American singer Kesha and featuring the Dap-Kings Horns for her third studio album Rainbow (2017). It was released as the first promotional single from the album on July 13, 2017. The song was then released as the second single from the album on January 22, 2018. It has been described as a feminist anthem. "Woman" was certified platinum by the Recording Industry Association of America (RIAA) for selling one million equivalent units in the United States.

== Background and composition ==
In an essay for Rolling Stone, Kesha wrote:

[…] I realized that for most of my life I was intimidated to even try and run in the leagues of the people I look up to. With "Woman," I hope my fans will hear that wild spirit still strong inside me but this time it was created more raw, spontaneously and with all live instrumentation, which I found was a huge reason I loved the records I did love. There were one or two or 12 different people playing real instruments together, and all that real human energy is exciting and very fun to listen to. I wanted this song to capture that organic, raw, soulful sound and keep the imperfect moments in the recordings because I find the magic in the imperfections.

— Kesha, Rolling Stone

Later, Kesha revealed the real purpose of releasing the song - to protest Donald Trump in offense to his "pussy grabbing comment," according to her interview with Metro.co.uk. In another interview with Rolling Stone, she stated, "I just really love being a woman and I wanted an anthem for anyone else who wants to yell about being self-sufficient and strong." Along with releasing the music video, she also released an essay detailing her intentions of writing the song and releasing it early from her album.

The song is performed in the key of F minor with a tempo of 115 beats per minute.

== Critical reception ==
Critics and fans alike praised the song. Rolling Stone called the song "funk-laden", while Business Insider identified the song as "funk-filled pop." USA Today hailed the song as "the feminist song of the summer".

=== Accolades ===
Select year-end rankings of "Woman"
Publication	List	Rank	Ref.
The Ringer	The Best Songs of 2017	10	
Stereogum	The Top 40 Pop Songs of 2017	15	

== Commercial performance ==
"Woman" debuted at number 96 on the US Billboard Hot 100 for the week ending August 5, 2017, selling 19,000 copies in the United States according to Nielsen Soundscan. Thanks to an array of dance remixes, "Woman" topped the Dance Club Songs chart on the issue dated December 23, 2017, becoming Kesha's third number one on that chart, and her first since "Timber" in 2014. In 2024, "Woman" received a platinum certification in the United States by the nation's RIAA (Recording Industry Association of America) for accomplishing sales of 1,000,000 equivalent units in the country.

== Music video ==
The music video for the song was released on July 13, 2017 and was directed by Kesha and her brother Lagan Sebert. In the video, she performs at a dive bar in Delaware with glitter and confetti streaming.

== Live performances ==
The song was part of the setlist of Kesha's Rainbow Tour. She performed the song on Good Morning America, where she also performed "Praying". Kesha also performed the song at numerous iHeart Radio festivals. On January 22, 2018, Kesha released the official live version, which was recorded during her Rainbow Tour.

== Usage in media ==
This song was included at the end of the 2017 Christmas Comedy film A Bad Moms Christmas. This song was also featured in the 2020 DC Extended Universe film Birds of Prey with Kesha praising the usage of her song.

== Track listing ==
Digital download and streaming

1. "Woman" – 3:16

Digital download and streaming (Remixes)

1. "Woman" (Dave Audé Remix) – 3:25
2. "Woman" (Rare Candy Remix) – 2:59
3. "Woman" (Tobtok Remix) – 3:08

== Charts ==
=== Weekly charts ===
Weekly chart performance for "Woman"
Chart (2017–18)	Peak position
Australia (ARIA)	78
Canada Hot 100 (Billboard)	80
Canada Hot AC (Billboard)	49
New Zealand Heatseekers (RMNZ)	3
Scottish Singles Sales (Official Charts)	66
UK Singles Chart Update (Official Charts)	96
UK Singles Sales (Official Charts)	89
US Billboard Hot 100	96
US Adult Pop Airplay (Billboard)	26
US Dance Club Songs (Billboard)	1
US Pop Airplay (Billboard)	33

=== Year-end charts ===
Year-end chart performance for "Woman"
Chart (2018)	Position
US Dance Club Songs (Billboard)	44

== Certifications ==
Certifications for "Woman"
Region	Certification	Certified units/sales
United States (RIAA)	Platinum	1,000,000^{‡}
^{‡} Sales+streaming figures based on certification alone.

== Release history ==
Release dates and formats for "Woman"
Region	Date	Format(s)	Version	Label(s)	Ref.
Various	July 13, 2017 (Note: Release as a promotional single.)	Digital download; streaming	Original	Kemosabe	
Various	September 29, 2017	Digital download; streaming	Remixes	Kemosabe	
United States	January 22, 2018	Hot / Modern / AC radio	Original	RCA; Kemosabe	
United States	January 23, 2018	Contemporary hit radio	Original	RCA; Kemosabe	
