= Andrew Joslyn =

American composer

Andrew Joslyn is an American composer, orchestrator, film scorer, and violinist in various genres.

== Early life and education ==
Joslyn was born in Pomona, California, but moved to Washington with his family when he was three and grew up on Bainbridge Island. His father is a family therapist and his mother is a Hungarian model, actress and artist. She came to the United States after the Hungarian Revolution of 1956. Joslyn was raised as a Zen Buddhist from an early age, and both his parents run the Entsuan Zen center on Bainbridge. His half-brother, Chris Kattan, is a comedian who was famous for his work on and off Saturday Night Live in the period 1996–2003.

Joslyn began studying violin at the age of five, with the Suzuki string method, and grew up studying music composition and performance. Joslyn attended Bainbridge High School, graduating in 2001 and received his B.A. in English literature and violin performance from Western Washington University in 2005 and his master's certificate in music business from the Berklee College of Music in Boston. While in college, he took part in studying contemporary music, ranging from rock, folk, fiddle, world, to hip-hop, film, and electronic musical genres.

== Musical career ==
Andrew Joslyn began his professional career in music when he toured and wrote with the Pacific Northwest folk rock band Handful of Luvin’ from 2002 to 2010. After the release of their third album Life in Between, he left the band and started his own career as an orchestrator and composer.

In 2008, Joslyn began collaborating with Macklemore & Ryan Lewis on the Vs. EP, the Vs. Redux EP, and the chart-topping album The Heist. He co-wrote the tracks "Neon Cathedral" and also "Wings", which was used for commercials involving the 2013 NBA All-Star Game. Joslyn worked with some other known musicians, including: Macklemore & Ryan Lewis, David Bazan (Pedro the Lion), Allen Stone, Ivan & Alyosha, Mark Lanegan, Grieves and Budo (Rhymesayers).

Joslyn composed and arranged extensively for the Seattle Rock Orchestra, He leads the Passenger String Quartet, which has backed artists including Duff McKagan, Suzanne Vega, Daniel Bernard Roumain, folk legend Judy Collins, and DJ Spooky.

In early 2013, Joslyn was hired to arrange strings and brass for American alternative rock icon Mark Lanegan for Imitations (album). In March 2013, Joslyn arranged strings for Duff McKagan's film documentary, "It's So Easy and Other Lies", based on McKagan's book of the same title. The Passenger Quartet played the arrangements live at the Moore Theatre in Seattle along with McKagan and his band. In 2014, Joslyn collaborated with Seattle indie-rocker David Bazan to write the album: David Bazan and the Passenger String Quartet: Volume 1. Bazan and Joslyn toured the album nationally at the end of 2014.

Joslyn has performed live on TV with Mary Lambert on The Tonight Show with Jay Leno on January 10, 2014, Macklemore & Ryan Lewis at the 56th Grammy Awards on January 26, 2014, and with Macklemore and Ryan Lewis at the 2015 American Music Awards where they debuted the emotional new song "Kevin", which Joslyn helped co-write In late 2016, he began scoring music for the true crime series Casefile True Crime Podcast.

In October 2016, Joslyn released the lead single of his solo record, "Plastic Heaven," and it was premiered both by Atwood Magazine, and Afropunk publications. In February 2017, Joslyn released his debut orchestral solo record, "Awake at the Bottom of the Ocean." The record is a collection of genre bending, Orchestral Pop music and features Joslyn's songwriting and arrangements along with the vocals of some of the most iconic Northwest musicians and beyond, including Mark Lanegan (Queens of the Stone Age), Shelby Earl, Adra Boo (Fly Moon Royalty), Will Jordan, Billy McCarthy (Augustines), Eric Anderson (Cataldo) and Susy Sun. Early features in Paste, Afro-Punk, City Arts, Yahoo Music, The Seattle Weekly and support from Seattle's taste-maker, KEXP, paved the way for a very successful first release. Paste Magazine gave the record a 9/10 rating. The record was in the top 50 records on KEXP's variety charts, and top 3 of the Northwest charts.

In 2016, Joslyn was brought in to help co-write the song, "Praying" for American singer Kesha, and produced by Ryan Lewis. After its release "Praying" received universal acclaim from music critics, who praised Kesha's vocals while calling the song powerful and noting it as a departure from her previous efforts. Commentators offered conflicting interpretations of the song's message; some felt that "Praying" was about forgiveness, while others thought that Kesha displayed anger on the track. Commercially, "Praying" reached number six in Australia as well as the top 20 in Canada, Hungary and Scotland, and the top 30 in Ireland, Spain, the United Kingdom, and the United States. It was also certified at least Platinum in the latter, Australia and Canada. "Praying" was nominated for Best Pop Solo Performance at the 60th Annual Grammy Awards.

Joslyn is also a film composer, and scored several feature films throughout his career. In 2017, composed an original score for his first feature-length film, "American Violence", starring Denise Richards, Bruce Dern, and Kaiwi Lyman-Mersereau. Shortly thereafter, he composed the original score for the American Western film "Hickok," based on the exploits of Wild Bill Hickok in the small town of Abilene, starring Luke Hemsworth and Trace Adkins. In 2019 he scored the horror film "Soviet Sleep Experiment" starring Chris Kattan, and the drama film "Lumber Baron" about the American lumber industry at the turn of the century.

In 2019 he won 2 BMI Pop Awards and 1 BMI Hip Hop Award for his co-writing the songs "Praying" and "Good Old Days".

In addition to his professional career, Joslyn is also an avid advocate for the arts, and in 2021 was appointed co-chair of National Advocacy of the Recording Academy.

== Discography ==
He is listed as songwriter/composer on nearly four hundred recordings in the BMI database.

- 2019 - Leslie Odom Jr. - Mr. Album
- 2017 - Kesha (Praying) - Songwriter
- 2017 - Andrew Joslyn (Awake at the Bottom of the Ocean) - Composer, Producer
- 2016 - Chris Staples (Golden Age) - String Arrangement, Viola, Violin
- 2016 - Augustines (Augustines) - Strings
- 2016 - Macklemore & Ryan Lewis (This Unruly Mess I've Made) - String Arrangements, Strings, Composer
- 2014 – Mary Lambert (Heart On My Sleeve) – Violin
- 2013 – Mark Lanegan (Imitations) – String arrangements, viola, violin
- 2013 – Mary Lambert (She Keeps Me Warm) – String Arrangement, violin
- 2012 – Macklemore & Ryan Lewis (The Heist) – composer, percussion, viola, violin, vocals
