= Olivia Bee =

American photographer

- Born: April 5, 1994 (age 32); Portland, Oregon, U.S.
- Occupation: Photographer

Olivia Bolles (born April 5, 1994), better known as Olivia Bee, is an American photographer. Bee's book Kids in Love was published by Aperture in 2016.

== Personal life ==
Bee is the daughter of a hairdresser mother and a high-tech worker. She grew up in Portland, Oregon, where she attended Da Vinci Arts Middle School. She moved to Brooklyn, New York when she was 18 years old.

== Photography ==
Bee's interest in photography began at the age of 11 when she first took a photography class. In 2013 she summarized her early work as "like, stuffed animals and a picture of my mom in the kitchen." Afterwards, Bee began taking photos independently and uploading them to the image hosting website Flickr, where the footwear company Converse saw her work and asked her to photograph for their company. Her work was used in an advertising campaign for Converse when she was 14. Her work was also used in campaigns for Adidas, Fiat, Hermès, Levi Strauss & Co., Nike and Subaru, and published by The New York Times and Le Monde. Bee decided to pursue photography as a full-time career after unsuccessfully applying to study at Cooper Union in New York City.

Kurt Soller of New York described her work as "dreamy, seventies-inspired photographs of maybe-wasted, increasingly famous young people who just want to have fun, injected with ombré washes of color (often pink)", while Kathy Sweeney of The Guardian observed that "Bee finds a dreamlike, innocent colour in her friends' gently dissolute experimentation." In an interview with Paper Magazine, Bee characterized her work as "real, obsessive emotions put in a pop context." The subjects in her photographs are often placed in the center of the frame.

In 2011 she cited Ryan McGinley, Annie Leibovitz and Nan Goldin as influences, and attributed her inspiration to her younger brother, mother and father's musical and artistic talents.

Bee's book Kids in Love was published by Aperture in 2016. The book is divided into two sections, one featuring predominantly staged shots and the other focusing on "slice of life" material.

== Other work ==
In 2018 Bee featured in the short film A Kid From Somewhere: Olivia Bee, directed by Paul Johnston and Adam Beck. The film depicts Bee's photographic process, focusing in part on a project completed in honour of her sister, who died before she was born. In 2021 she directed the music video for Olivia Rodrigo's song "Traitor". In 2022 she directed the music video for Ingrid Andress's "Feel Like This".

== Publications ==
- Kids in Love. New York City: Aperture, 2016. ISBN 978-1597113458. With an interview by Tavi Gevinson.
