= Long Island (California) =

Island in California

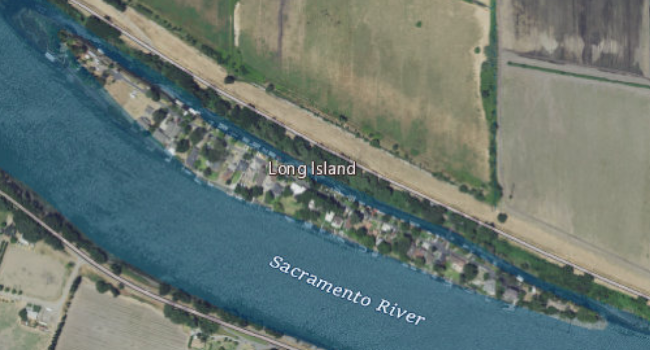
- USGS aerial imagery of Long Island in the w:Sacramento River; to the south is w:Brannan Island, and to the north a bridge connects to Grand Island.

- Location within Sacramento-San Joaquin River Delta Location within California Location within the United States

Geography
- Location: Northern California
- Coordinates: 38°10′01″N 121°37′30″W
- Adjacent to: Sacramento–San Joaquin River Delta
- Highest elevation: 7 ft (2.1 m)

Administration
- United States
- State: California
- County: Sacramento

Long Island is a small island in the Sacramento–San Joaquin River Delta. It is part of Sacramento County, California. Its coordinates are 38°10′01″N 121°37′30″W, and the United States Geological Survey measured its elevation as 7 ft (2.1 m) in 1981. It appears on 1978 USGS maps of the area.
