= Kesha and the Creepies: Fuck the World Tour =

2016–17 concert tour by Kesha

Fuck the World Tour
- Tour by Kesha
- Location: Asia; North America
- Start date: July 23, 2016
- End date: July 22, 2017
- Legs: 2
- No. of shows: 43

Kesha concert chronology
- Warrior Tour (2013–15); Kesha and the Creepies: Fuck the World Tour (2016–17); Rainbow Tour (2017–19)

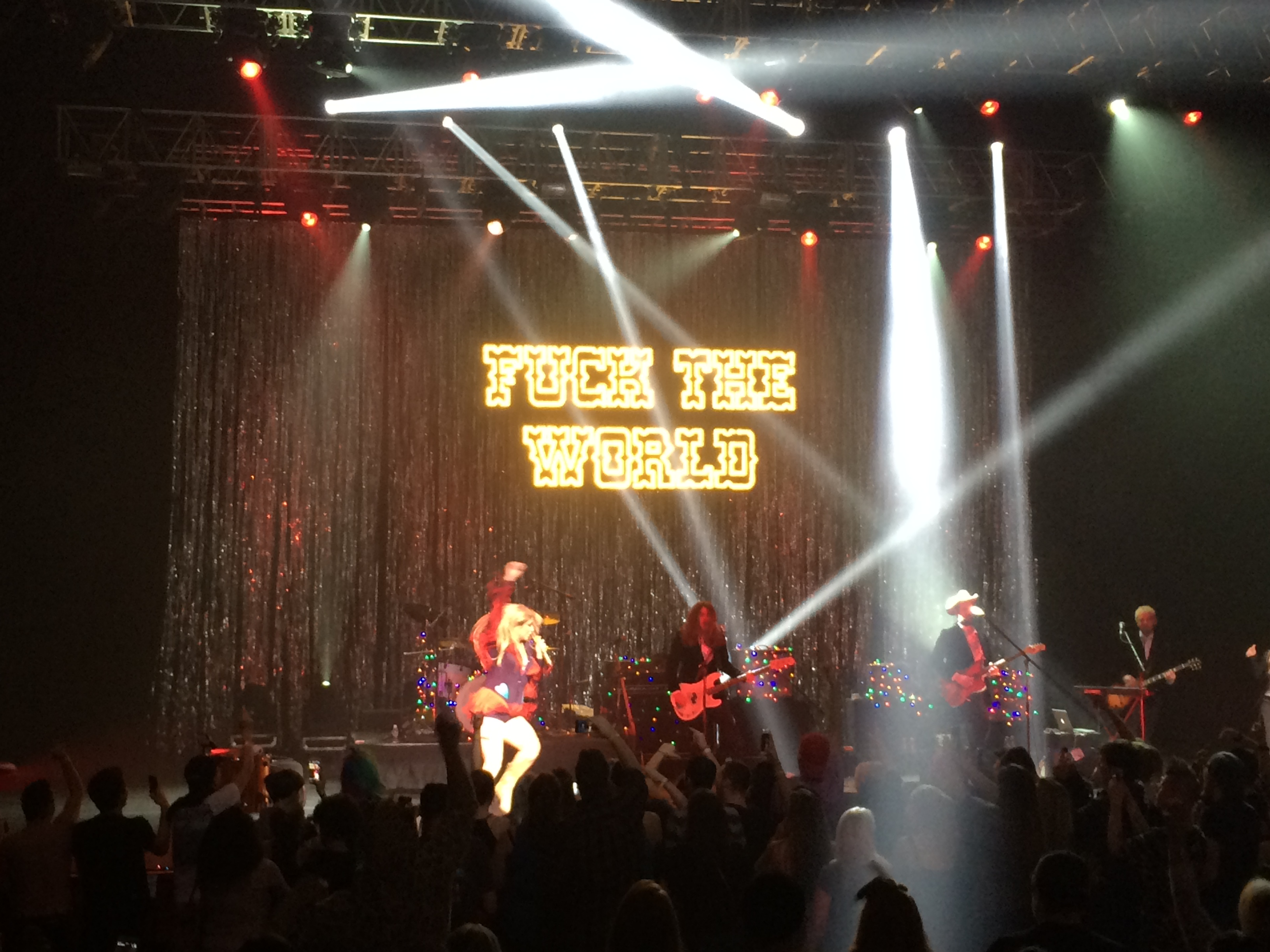
Kesha performing at Foxwoods on her Fuck the World Tour

The Kesha and the Creepies: Fuck the World Tour is the third headlining concert tour by American singer Kesha. The tour started in Las Vegas on July 23, 2016. The tour has been described by her as "So, for a short ride and in mostly intimate venues, I will be performing a new creepy creation. It's been too long", and "Songs you've never heard me play before and I may never play again". The tour traveled throughout North America, and was extended to Asia, playing three shows in China in October.

== Background and development ==
On February 19, 2016, New York Supreme Court Justice Shirley Kornreich ruled against Kesha's request for a preliminary injunction that would release her from her contract with Kemosabe Records, a label owned by Lukasz Gottwald, also known as Dr. Luke, under the umbrella of Sony Music Entertainment. This later inspired her to create the tour, "for the pure love of rock n roll" and it is seen as an act of defiance.

== Set list ==
1. "We R Who We R"
2. "Your Love Is My Drug"
3. "Dinosaur"
4. "Nightclubbing"
5. "True Colors"
6. "You Don't Own Me"
7. "Blow"
8. "Speaking in Tongues"
9. "Boots & Boys"
10. "Cannibal"
11. "Timber"
12. "Tik Tok"

Encore

13. "Jolene" / "Old Flames Can't Hold a Candle to You"
14. "I Shall Be Released"

Notes

- On select dates, Kesha performed "Till the World Ends" and "Die Young", in place of "True Colors" and "I Shall Be Released", respectively.
- "Old Flames Can't Hold a Candle to You" was not performed on select dates.
- During the Asian leg, Kesha performed "Stephen", "Jealous", "Warrior", "Gold Trans Am", "Dirty Love", "Party at a Rich Dude's House", and "Animal".
- Metal musician and YouTube Star, Poppy, opened for Kesha at the Dubuque, IA leg of the tour. She was also booed.

== Tour dates ==
List of 2016 concerts
Date (2016)	City	Country	Venue
July 23	Las Vegas	United States	Intrigue
July 28	Windsor	Canada	The Colosseum at Caesars Windsor
July 30 (Note: The July 30, 2016 concert was part of Dubuque County Fair.)	Dubuque	United States	Dubuque County Fairgrounds
August 6	Atlantic City	United States	Harrah's Atlantic City
August 7 (Note: The August 7 and 21, 2016 concerts were part of Mad Decent Block Party.)	New York City	United States	MCU Park
August 9	Cleveland	United States	House of Blues
August 10	Pittsburgh	United States	Mr. Smalls
August 12	Detroit	United States	Saint Andrew's Hall
August 13	Grand Rapids	United States	The Intersection
August 16	Cincinnati	United States	Bogart's
August 18	Minneapolis	United States	Aria
August 19	Milwaukee	United States	The Rave
August 21	Chicago	United States	Huntington Bank Pavilion
August 23	Louisville	United States	Mercury Ballroom
August 25 (Note: The August 25, 2016 concert was part of New York State Fair.)	Syracuse	United States	Chevrolet Court
September 2	Columbus	United States	Schottenstein Center
September 9	Tempe	United States	Wells Fargo Arena
September 17 (Note: The September 17, 2016 concert was part of Music Midtown.)	Atlanta	United States	Piedmont Park
September 22	New York City	United States	Warsaw
September 29	Kent	United States	Dix Stadium
October 1	Los Angeles	United States	Los Angeles Center Studios
October 4	Shanghai	China	Shanghai Grand Stage
October 6	Beijing	China	LeSports Center
October 8	Guangzhou	China	Guangzhou Baiyun Stadium
October 21	Minneapolis	United States	TCF Bank Stadium
October 22	Miami Beach	United States	Fontainebleau
October 23	Jacksonville	United States	Mavericks
October 25	Tampa	United States	The Ritz Ybor
October 27	New York City	United States	Pace University Auditorium
October 29	Waterville	United States	Harold Alfond Memorial Field

List of 2017 concerts
Date (2017)	City	Country	Venue
January 27	Bowling Green	United States	Doyt Perry Stadium
February 15	Mashantucket	United States	Foxwoods Theater
March 30	Baton Rouge	United States	Pete Maravich Assembly Center
April 1	Charleston	United States	O'Brien Field
April 4	Galloway	United States	Stockton University Sports Center
April 7	Ewing	United States	Lions Stadium
April 8	Boston	United States	Matthews Arena
April 23	Rochester	United States	Eunice Kennedy Shriver Stadium
April 25	Conway	United States	Estes Stadium
April 27	East Lansing	United States	Breslin Student Events Center
June 15 (Note: The June 15, 2017 concert was part of Firefly Music Festival.)	Dover	United States	Dover International Speedway
July 20	Council Bluffs	United States	Harrah's Stir Cove
July 21	Aurora	United States	RiverEdge Park
July 22	Lawrenceburg	United States	Lawrenceburg Event Center
