= Learn to Let Go =

Promotional single by Kesha

from the album Rainbow
- Released: July 28, 2017
- Studio: Elysian Park (Los Angeles)
- Length: 3:38
- Label: RCA; Kemosabe
- Songwriters: Kesha Sebert; Stuart Crichton; Pebe Sebert
- Producers: Ricky Reed; Crichton

Music video
- "Learn to Let Go" on YouTube

"Learn to Let Go" is a song recorded by the American singer-songwriter Kesha. It appears on her third studio album, Rainbow (2017). It was released as the second promotional single from the album on July 28, 2017. Digital remixes were released worldwide on November 10, 2017.

== Composition ==
Kesha was inspired to write "Learn to Let Go" by one of her friends who went through "the worst childhood imaginable." The track was the first to be written for the album and was also based on Kesha's struggles while making Rainbow. About the song, Kesha told HuffPost:

[...] The only way to truly evolve is to let the past be the past and move forward with an open heart. If you let your demons haunt you, they will haunt you forever. Learn from your mistakes but don't dwell on them, and if you feel like someone has wronged you, let that be their problem – not yours. As much as our past creates who we are, we can't let it define us or hold us back. And especially if you've been through something hard, and we all have, you can't hold on to resentment because it's like a poison. You have to learn to let go of those bad feelings and move forward.

— Kesha, HuffPost

She has also described the song's title as "one of my mantras over the last few years."

== Music video ==
The music video for "Learn to Let Go" was released on July 27, 2017. In the video, Kesha shares home video footage of herself as a child, running in nature, singing and dancing wildly. The Costco bear appears in the video.

== Live performances ==
The song was first performed live at the 2017 MTV Europe Music Awards on November 12. On November 14, Kesha performed the song live at the BBC Radio 1 Live Lounge, as well as a cover of Marshmello's song "Silence" featuring Khalid.

Kesha appeared on The Graham Norton Show to perform her song live, on November 24.

== Commercial performance ==
Despite not being issued as a single in North America, "Learn to Let Go" debuted at number 97 on the US Billboard Hot 100 issue dated August 8, 2017 as a promotional single. It also peaked at number 81 on the Canadian Hot 100.

== Accolades ==
Select year-end rankings of "Learn to Let Go"
Publication	List	Rank	Ref.
Dazed	The 20 Best Tracks of 2017	12	

== Track listing ==
Digital download and streaming

1. "Learn to Let Go" – 3:38

Digital download and streaming (the remixes)

1. "Learn to Let Go" (Feenixpawl remix) – 3:22
2. "Learn to Let Go" (Michael Brun remix) – 3:37

== Charts ==
Chart performance for "Learn to Let Go"
Chart (2017)	Peak position
Canada Hot 100 (Billboard)	81
New Zealand Heatseekers (RMNZ)	6
Scotland Singles (OCC)	30
US Billboard Hot 100	97

== Certifications ==
Region	Certification	Certified units/sales
United States (RIAA)	Gold	500,000^{‡}
^{‡} Sales+streaming figures based on certification alone.

== Release history ==
Release dates and formats for "Learn to Let Go"
Region	Date	Formats	Version	Label	Ref.
Various	July 28, 2017	Digital download; streaming	Original	Kemosabe	
Various	November 10, 2017	Digital download; streaming	The remixes	Kemosabe	
