= Hymn (Kesha song) =

2017 promotional single by Kesha

Promotional single by Kesha

from the album Rainbow
- Released: August 3, 2017
- Studio: Elysian Park (Los Angeles, CA)
- Genre: Synth-pop
- Length: 3:25
- Label: Kemosabe; RCA
- Songwriters: Kesha Sebert; Jonny Price; Cara Salimando; Pebe Sebert; Eric Frederic
- Producers: Ricky Reed; Jonny Price

Music video
- "Hymn" on YouTube

"Hymn" is a song recorded by American singer Kesha, from her third studio album, Rainbow. It was released as a promotional single on August 3, 2017. "Hymn" contains references to those who feel like they do not belong, such as those with no religion. The song was originally titled "Hymn for the Hymnless".

== Composition ==
Kesha has stated that she was inspired to write "Hymn" for people who feel like outcasts in society and feel they do not have a "hymn" or a set way of life. In an essay Kesha wrote about the song, she told Mic:

[...] This song is dedicated to all the idealistic people around the world who refuse to turn their backs on progress, love and equality whenever they are challenged. It's dedicated to the people who went out into the streets all over the world to protest against racism, hate and division of any kind. It's also dedicated to anyone who feels like they are not understood by the world or respected for exactly who they are. It's a hopeful song about all of these people—which I consider myself one of—and the power that we all have when we all come together.

— Kesha, Mic

== Music video ==
The music video for the song was released on May 31, 2018. Upon releasing the video, Kesha stated that although she had been holding onto the video for a while, meeting Cristina Jiménez of United We Dream had inspired her to release it and dedicate the song to the organization's Deferred Action for Childhood Arrivals (DACA) program.

In the video, Kesha is seen riding in the backseat of a self-driven car on a seemingly deserted highway. She sings the lyrics to "Hymn" and looks up at the sky, showing that it is dusk. The car comes to a stop in front of a group of people, who were previously shown individually, that are staring upward at an approaching spaceship. After Kesha gets out of the car to join them, the UFO abducts her car and tries to abduct the crowd beneath it, to no avail. Finally, the spaceship blasts off and a nonchalant Kesha walks down the highway, now carless.

== Charts ==
Chart (2017)	Peak position
New Zealand Heatseekers (RMNZ)	6
Scotland Singles (OCC)	88
