= Praying (song) =

2017 single by Kesha

Single by Kesha

from the album Rainbow
- Released: July 6, 2017
- Studio: The Village (Los Angeles, California); Studios 301 (Alexandria, Australia); Robert Lang (Shoreline, Washington)
- Genre: Pop
- Length: 3:50
- Label: Kemosabe; RCA
- Songwriters: Kesha Sebert; Andrew Joslyn; Ben Abraham; Ryan Lewis
- Producers: Jon Castelli; Ryan Lewis

Kesha singles chronology
"True Colors" (2016)	"Praying" (2017)	"Good Old Days" (2017)

Music video
- "Praying" on YouTube

"Praying" is a song by American singer and songwriter Kesha. It was made available for digital download by Kemosabe Records on July 6, 2017, as the lead single from her third studio album, Rainbow. The track originated from Ryan Lewis, who contacted Kesha and offered her an early version of the song. "Praying" was written by the singer with Ben Abraham, Andrew Joslyn, and its producer, Lewis, and co-produced by Jon Castelli. Musically, the song is a gospel and soul-influenced pop piano ballad that features minimal production and accompaniment from strings, such as cellos, backing vocals, and drums. Inspired by suicidal thoughts she has had in the past, Kesha said that "Praying" is about hoping that anyone, even abusers, can heal. "Praying" was written to showcase the singer's vocal range and to represent her as a person, and also features her nearly screaming at the top of her register.

"Praying" received universal acclaim from music critics, who praised Kesha's vocals while calling the song powerful and noting it as a departure from her previous efforts. Commentators offered conflicting interpretations of the song's message; some felt that "Praying" was about forgiveness, while others thought that Kesha displayed anger on the track. Commercially, "Praying" reached the top 10 in Australia, the top 20 in Canada, Hungary, and Scotland, and the top 30 in Ireland, the United Kingdom, and the United States. It was certified 5× platinum by the Recording Industry Association of America (RIAA) for selling five million equivalent units in the United States. "Praying" was nominated for Best Pop Solo Performance at the 60th Annual Grammy Awards.

An accompanying music video for "Praying" was directed by Jonas Åkerlund and was released simultaneously with the single. It features Kesha at Salvation Mountain along with various religious symbolism, both Christian and Hindu. The clip received a generally positive response from critics and was often compared to Beyoncé's visual album Lemonade (2016). To promote the song, Kesha performed it live on multiple occasions, including her Rainbow Tour (2017–2019), at the 2017 iHeartRadio Music Festival, The Tonight Show Starring Jimmy Fallon, The Ellen DeGeneres Show, Good Morning America, and the 60th Annual Grammy Awards. Critics praised Kesha's live performances.

== Background and release ==
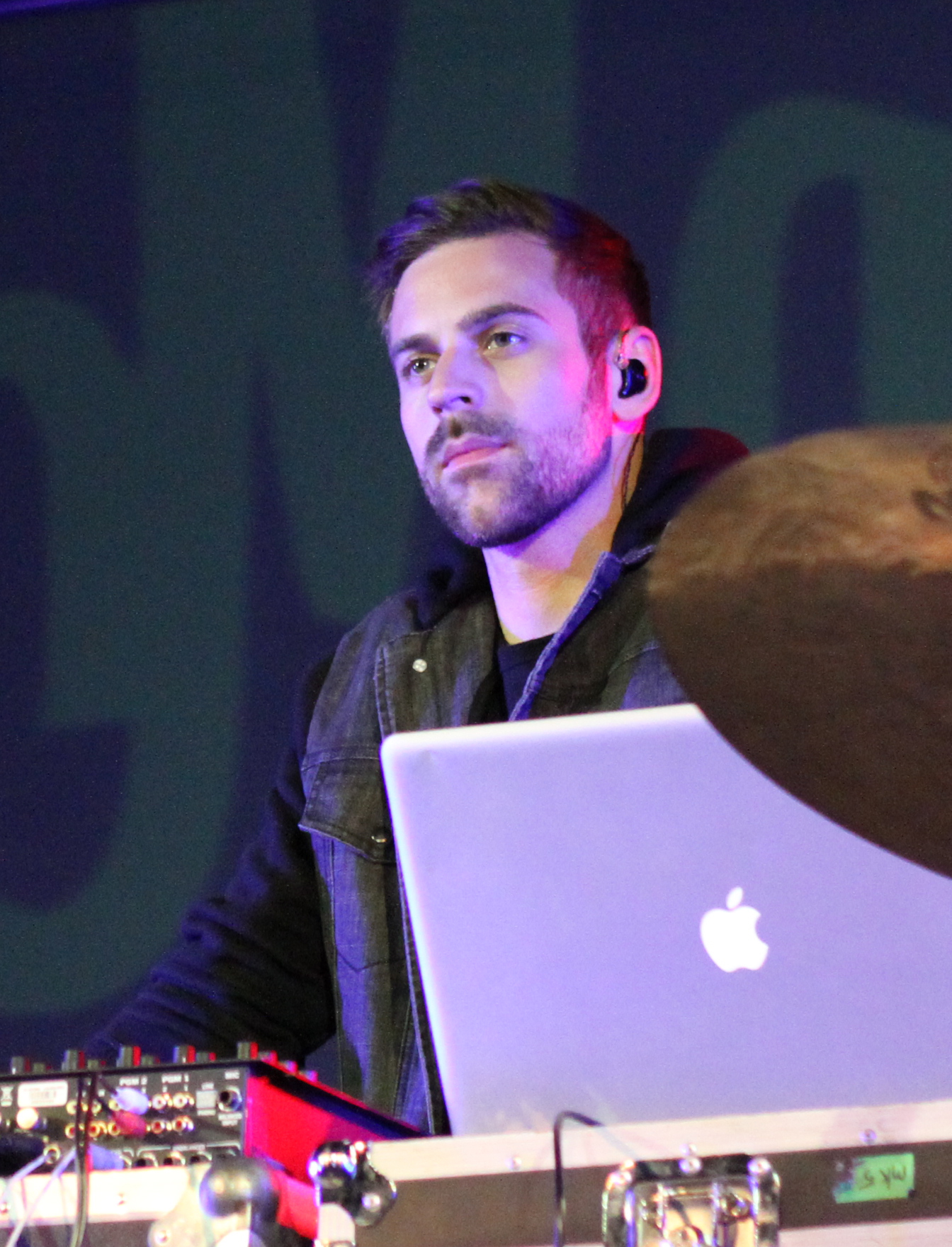
Ryan Lewis (pictured) co-wrote and produced "Praying".

From July to October 2016, Kesha embarked on her third world tour, Kesha and the Creepies: Fuck the World Tour, where she performed various cover versions of songs and several rock and country reworkings of her own material. During this time, the singer wrote multiple songs for what would become her third studio album Rainbow (2017). Producer Ryan Lewis began working on the lyrics and production of "Praying" while he was on tour over a year before its release. He felt that the ballad would be suitable for a female artist, with his wife suggesting that Kesha should sing it. Lewis subsequently contacted the singer's management and Kesha later accepted the offer due to her fondness for his work with Macklemore, particularly admiring how their discography featured a mix of "fun" and politically progressive songs. Lewis came to Kesha with a "rough idea" for the song and encouraged her to do whatever she wanted on the track. When she belted out a whistle note, she surprised him; Lewis later said it was one of his favorite moments to occur in a studio. "Praying" was completed two days after Kesha began working on it. Lewis said that his ambitions when writing the song were to showcase the singer's vocal range and represent her as a person, eventually feeling that the finished track accomplished both goals.

In a radio interview with SiriusXM, Kesha revealed that "Praying" deals with her past suicidal thoughts. On the same occasion, she said that she feels it is healthy to discuss such emotions, and that "[she] think[s] the beautiful part is that you hold onto hope [...] and you keep showing up for yourself." Prior to its release, the singer premiered "Praying" and four other songs from Rainbow at a press playback in London. There, she expressed her feelings about the song, saying: "I've never been more excited about a piece of art I've ever done in my entire life. This is truly from the inside of my guts." Kesha later announced the single's release in a video aimed at her fans. In an accompanying letter posted to Lena Dunham's feminist blog Lenny Letter, she wrote about the meaning of the track: "I have channeled my feelings of severe hopelessness and depression, I've overcome obstacles, and I have found strength in myself even when it felt out of reach. I've found what I had thought was an unobtainable place of peace. This song is about coming to feel empathy for someone else even if they hurt you or scare you. It's a song about learning to be proud of the person you are even during low moments when you feel alone. It's also about hoping everyone, even someone who hurt you, can heal."

== Composition and lyrical interpretation ==
"Praying"
A 19-second sample of "Praying", a gospel and soul-influenced pop piano ballad.

"Praying" is a pop piano ballad written by Kesha, Ryan Lewis, Ben Abraham, and Andrew Joslyn that features elements of gospel and soul music. The song was produced by Lewis and is written in the key of G minor, with a moderately slow tempo of 74 beats per minute. Vox's Caroline Framke felt that the track was a departure from the "dive bar party anthems" which Kesha has become known for. The song's production is minimal, with Kesha joined on the track by violins, violas, strings, cellos, "distant" backing vocals and drums. Dan Weiss of Billboard deemed "Praying"'s arrangement "unfashionable" and said the song does not sound like contemporary music. The chorus of "Praying" features Kesha singing "I hope you're somewhere praying, praying/ I hope your soul is changing, changing/ I hope you find your peace falling on your knees, praying." The refrain has been described as "soaring but simple" by Spencer Kornhaber of The Atlantic, in the vein of Christina Aguilera's "Beautiful" (2002) and Lady Gaga's "Til It Happens to You" (2015).

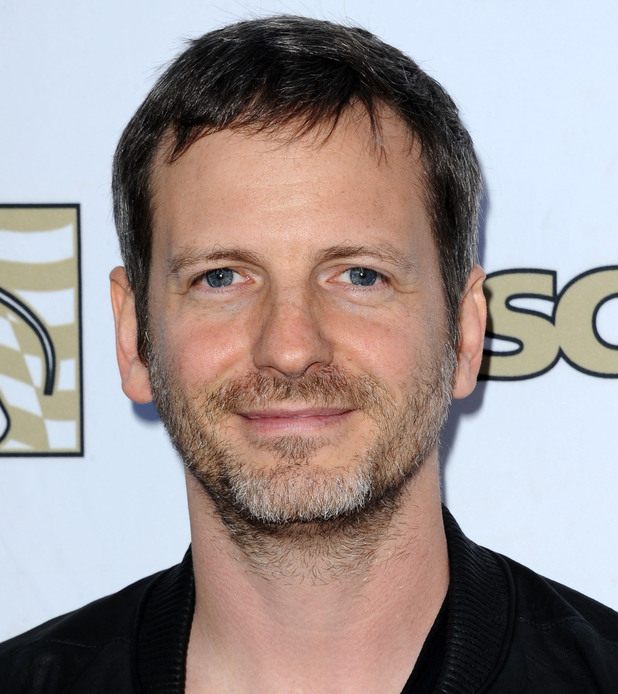
According to several critics, the lyrics to "Praying" are about Dr. Luke (pictured).

According to Kesha, "Praying" is "about hoping everyone, even someone who hurt you, can heal." The song addresses a tormentor with the lyrics: "You brought the flames and you put me through hell/ I had to learn how to fight for myself/ And we both know all the truth I could tell/ I'll just say this: I wish you farewell." The Atlantic's Kornhaber thought that the track's message was "love your enemies" and displayed "Christlike grace", further noting that Kesha did not exude invulnerability on "Praying" the way she did in some of her previous songs, like "Dinosaur" (2010). Similarly, Eve Barlow of Variety said that Kesha "pushes through her demons and possesses a remarkable level of empathy and understanding" on the track. Conversely, Pitchfork's Jillian Mapes felt that the song's sentiments were akin to "telling the person who ruined your life to 'take care' when you really mean 'fuck you,'" while Billboard's Weiss interpreted the recording as a "coded threat that [Kesha] will no longer be silenced." According to Tatiana Cirisano of the same publication, "While the chorus aims for reconciliation with an unnamed listener...there's still a flicker of anger in the singer's words, like in the lyric '...When I'm finished, they won't even know your name.'"

The Guardian, The Atlantic, MTV UK, and Complex each reported that the song was about Dr. Luke, the producer whom Kesha accused of sexually assaulting and emotionally abusing her in a lawsuit, although the song never mentions Dr. Luke by name. Kornhaber felt that the song's opening lyrics — "You almost had me fooled / Told me that I was nothing without you" — recall the singer's allegation that Dr. Luke told her: "You are not that pretty, you are not that talented, you are just lucky to have me....You are nothing without me." Weiss of Billboard found the track similar to Alanis Morissette's "You Oughta Know" (1995), which "empowered women to...call out men's abuses," "A Torch" (1998), a song about a vengeful rape victim from Sarge's album The Glass Intact, and Rihanna's "Russian Roulette" (2009), which deals with the singer's assault at the hands of Chris Brown.

Kesha has said that "Praying" "showcases [her] voice in a way [it] has never been showcased in [her] entire life." According to sheet music published by Musicnotes.com, her vocals on the track span from the low note of D_{3} to the high note of F_{6}. Mapes of Pitchfork noted that Kesha's voice on "Praying" is less digitally manipulated than on her past material. Three minutes and 14 seconds into the track, she sings at the top of her register, nearly screaming in a manner reminiscent of Mariah Carey. The song's high note was compared to Demi Lovato's vocal performance on "Skyscraper" (2011) and Sia's vocal performance on "Alive" (2015) by Billboard's Weiss. Ryan Dunn, writing for The United Methodist Church, thought that the story of Jonah is woven throughout "Praying" and that for both Kesha and Jonah, prayer was instrumental in bringing them through distress.

== Critical reception and accolades ==
"Praying" received universal acclaim from music critics, who positively regarded it as a departure from Kesha's past work and public image, and called it a great comeback. Maria Sherman of Complex thought the track was "more purposeful than the music that made [Kesha] famous. Those looking to make pop music with real resonance would be wise to look to this song, and whatever Kesha does next." Forbes's Hugh McIntyre labelled "Praying" "very important", adding that "[Kesha] will have no trouble collecting many new fans as she enters this next phase of her career." Issy Sampson of The Guardian noted that the recording was to Kesha's oeuvre what "Fighter" (2003) was to Aguilera's. The New York Times' Jon Pareles described "Praying" as "a perfectly aimed missile of revenge and career rebooting." HuffPost's Daniel Welsh wrote that it was an "empowering and haunting ballad" which "may come as something of a surprise to more casual Kesha listeners, who are perhaps more used to hearing her glittery songs about partying and having a good time." According to Matthew Rozsa of Salon, "'Praying' is likely to be remembered as the moment when Ke$ha became Kesha — that is, when her overproduced image of a party girl transformed into that of a soulful artist". Caroline Framke of Vox said that "as Kesha embraces her pain and rage, the song becomes something much more intense and weird and furious and hopeful — something that feels much more like Kesha herself."

Kesha's vocals and emotional delivery were also praised by reviewers. Eve Barlow of Variety commented that the song would "be enough to induce goosebumps in even the harshest of cynics." Weiss of Billboard similarly commended the track, saying: "It would hard for even the biggest pop agnostic to not be rendered speechless by Kesha's new video and song 'Praying.'" In a separate Billboard article, Gil Kaufman thought that the song was "pure ecstasy for your ear buds." Time's Raisa Bruner called "Praying" "powerfully emotional", adding that "when she breaks out into a flawless whistle tone, it pretty much seals the deal: this new Kesha is stronger than ever, both as an artist and, seemingly, as a human." The Atlantic praised it for being "deeply felt", and said that "Kesha's voice is powerful here—and more capable than people might expect". William Ferrer of The Seattle Times said that "Praying" was "a bone-chilling must-listen," writing that "we're only one single into Rainbow...and I'm already certain her record is going to be one of the year's finest." According to Sampson of The Guardian, "Praying" is "a full-on chest-thumping, foot-stamping inspirational ballad, and [Kesha's] voice sounds better than ever....and it's good enough to make you forgive her for 'Timber' [sic]." Pitchfork's Jillian Mapes said that the song was "a powerful statement of resiliency, even if the resulting song's familiar piano melody sounds comparatively tepid." She favorably compared "Praying" to the works of Adele and Florence Welch. Althea Legaspi and Elias Leight of Rolling Stone similarly called the track "triumphant" and "uplifting", while Patrick Hosken of MTV deemed it "about as soul-baring as anything gets." Tom Breihan of Stereogum opined that the recording was "grand and expansive". The Singles Jukebox ranked "Praying" as the best song of 2017, writing: "The music nods at large-scale drama but, rather than letting the drum and piano echo into space, the thuds stay close to the ear, like Kesha's singing to her own heartbeat." At the 60th Annual Grammy Awards, "Praying" was nominated for Best Pop Solo Performance.

Select year-end rankings of "Praying"
Publication	List	Rank	Ref.
Billboard	The 100 Best Songs of 2017	18	
Cosmopolitan	The 24 Best Songs of 2017	9	
Entertainment Weekly	The 30 Best Songs of 2017	2	
NPR	The 100 Best Songs of 2017	4	
PopMatters	The 75 Best Songs Of 2017	45	
The Ringer	The Best Songs of 2017	10	
Spin	The 101 Best Songs of 2017	100	
Stereogum	The Top 40 Pop Songs of 2017	20	
Vanity Fair	The 17 Best Pop Songs of 2017	—N/a	

== Commercial performance ==
"Praying" debuted at number four on Billboard's Bubbling Under Hot 100 chart for the week ending July 22, 2017, although it was released during the last day of the sales, streaming and radio tracking week from June 30 to July 6, 2017. According to Nielsen SoundScan, "Praying" sold 17,738 copies in the United States in its first day of release. The song entered the Billboard Hot 100 at position 25 on July 29, 2017, falling down to number 40 the next edition with sales of further 27,000 copies. The track eventually reached a new peak at number 22 following the release of Rainbow. It also peaked on the Adult Top 40 and Mainstream Top 40 charts at numbers six and nine, respectively. Nielsen SoundScan reported in October 2017 that the song had moved 428,120 total copies in the United States. In 2024, the song was certified 5× platinum by the nation's Recording Industry Association of America (RIAA) for sales of 5 million equivalent units in the country.

Worldwide, "Praying" reached the top ten in Australia, while charting within the top 40 in multiple countries like Canada, Scotland, Ireland and the United Kingdom. The single was certified quadruple Platinum by Australia's Australian Recording Industry Association (ARIA) and Canada's Music Canada for selling 280,000 and 320,000 units, respectively.

== Music video ==
=== Background and development ===
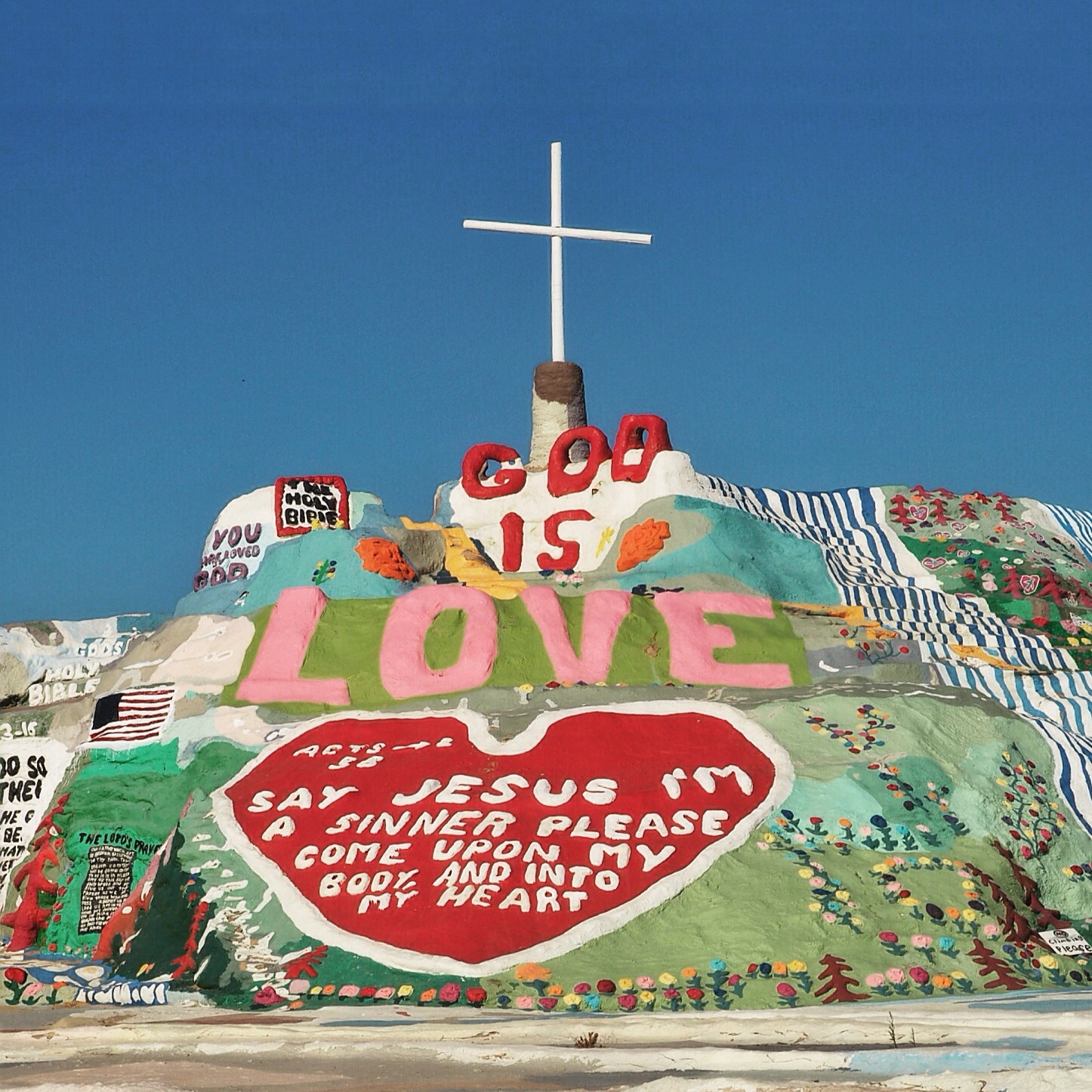
The music video for "Praying" was partially shot at Salvation Mountain.

The song's accompanying video, directed by Jonas Åkerlund, was released on July 6, 2017. Kesha has described the experience of working with Åkerlund as "a dream come true" and said that the process of shooting the video was akin to a good, long therapy session. The video was shot at Salvation Mountain, Niland, California, and the Salton Sea over the course of a single day. The outfits that the singer wore were inspired by the locations of the clip, as well as her fondness for vintage 1960s and 1970s clothing. Kesha and her stylist for the video, Samantha Burkhart, picked a rainbow dress for the singer to wear in the video, despite Åkerlund's concerns that the dress was too similar to that used for Beyoncé's "Hold Up" (2016) video. The director also wanted the singer to wear black angel wings in the video to make her appear "fucked-up", but Burkhart insisted that Kesha should wear white angel wings to emphasize her purity and beauty. Kesha has said that the music video depicts her life metaphorically. According to Burkhart, Kesha portrays a fallen angel who is "still very pure" in the clip.

=== Synopsis ===
The video alternates between black-and-white and color, while featuring title cards stylized to resemble Hindi script. The video commences with a shot of Kesha inside of a coffin, flanked by a pair of men wearing suits and drooling pig masks with a neon cross in the background. While inside of the casket, Kesha is seen wearing a nose ring, dark blue lipstick and a headpiece. Following this, she appears on the surface of the open ocean lying in a rafter. In a voice-over, she says: "Am I dead? Or is this one of those dreams? Those horrible dreams that seem like they last forever? If I am alive, why? If there is a God or whatever, something, somewhere, why have I been abandoned by everyone and everything I've ever known? I've ever loved? Stranded. What is the lesson? What is the point? God, give me a sign, or I have to give up. I can't do this anymore. Please just let me die. Being alive hurts too much." In the clip, the singer plays the piano while wearing a crown of thorns, angel wings and what Christina Cauterucci of Slate described as "a scaly mermaid-looking suit". Later, Kesha is seen with an eye painted on her forehead as she prays at an altar before a neon cross, while also chased by the men with pig masks. A recurring scene in the video features a wall of television sets with messages such as "the television will not be revolutionized", "weapons of mass deception", "do not engage," and "you're too thin" painted on them in red, with Kesha eventually ravaging them. Shots of her crying black tears are interspersed throughout the main plot of the visual. At the song's climax, Kesha throws around colored powder in a manner similar to what is done during Holi, a Hindu festival which celebrates the victory of good over evil. The clip ends with the singer walking on water like Jesus and text that says "the beginning".

=== Reception and analysis ===
Dan Weiss of Billboard praised the video, highlighting it as the best work Kesha released in her career. He found the religious imagery in the video reminiscent of Madonna's "Like a Prayer" (1989) and the clip's use of pigs similar to the video for Nine Inch Nails' "Closer" (1994) and the passage of Homer's Odyssey where Circe transforms men into swine. Stereogum's Breihan said the video was "a vivid, surreal vision from director Jonas Åkerlund" while MTV's Patrick Hosken called it emotional. Bruner of Time labelled the music video as "a powerful, colorful, and, yes, glitter-filled celebration of overcoming," further deeming it a comeback for the singer. HuffPost's Daniel Welsh felt that the video "feature[s] [Kesha's] usual mix of bright colours and outlandish costumes [and] an important message about overcoming troublesome times and seeing the light in the darkness." Jezebel writer Julianne Escobedo Shepherd found that the clip portrayed well Kesha's personal struggles in the past years. Mike Wass of Idolator deemed the video "an intense viewing experience." Nashville Scene's Stephen Trageser commented that the clip was psychedelic and bore similarities to the films of Alejandro Jodorowsky; he also felt that it marked a "glorious return" for Kesha.

Racked.com's Elana Fishman praised the singer's outfits in the video, including her rainbow gown, while Pareles of The New York Times felt they were influenced by the work of Lady Gaga. Kornhaber of The Atlantic said the clip is "a high-gloss technicolor pop production from one of the masters of the form, director Jonas Åkerlund" and that it reminded him of Kesha's earlier work. Conversely, The Arizona Republic's Zachary Hansen opined that the video's aesthetic was in stark contrast to it, showing "[the singer] at her most serious." Maria Sherman of Complex complimented the use of the Salvation Mountain in the video, writing: "It's the perfect backdrop for the song, [with its] bright, colorful bible [sic] verses painted on neon adobe in the Colorado Desert in California. It's an unexpected place to find hope, mirroring Kesha's move from desolation to empowerment." Cauterucci of Slate opined that the clip's use of religious symbolism "confuses the thrust of the song", adding that the imagery "speak[s] to [Kesha's] vision for her new album as a kind of rebirth."

Vox's Framke felt that the video referenced Beyoncé's visual album Lemonade (2016) multiple times. Framke found the monologue in the video similar to Beyoncé's "Pray You Catch Me" (2016), while the rainbow outfit that Kesha wore reminded her of the yellow dress that Beyoncé sported in her "Hold Up" video, which was also directed by Åkerlund. The author further wrote that "evoking Beyoncé's imagery at the video's onset dilutes the message, making it feel more like an homage than the emotional purge [Kesha] says it is." Similarly, The Stranger's Amber Cortes criticized Kesha for taking influence from Beyoncé's work in the "Praying" clip, writing that it emulated the "watery imagery" of the video for "Hold Up". William Ferrer of The Seattle Times also found the visual similar to Lemonade, but added "there's something haunting about 'Praying' that sets it apart from Lemonade. [It] feels more ethereal, more eerily uncertain than Beyonce's self-assured tour de force. And [...] 'Praying' is better for it."

== Live performances ==
Kesha performed "Praying" live during her Rainbow Tour, which lasted from September to November 2017. Other appearances occurred at the Electric Birxton in South London, the YouTube Space in Los Angeles, the 2017 iHeartRadio Music Festival, The Tonight Show Starring Jimmy Fallon, The Ellen DeGeneres Show, Good Morning America. The singer's performances received praise from editors of multiple publications, such as LA Weekly, The Daily Telegraph, The Fader, Billboard, Vanity Fair, Rolling Stone and Entertainment Weekly, for her vocals, stage presence and emotional delivery. During the 60th Annual Grammy Awards ceremony on January 28, 2018, Kesha, who was nominated for Best Pop Solo Performance and Best Pop Vocal Album, performed the song with Cyndi Lauper, Julia Michaels, Bebe Rexha, Camila Cabello and Andra Day.

It has consistently been on the setlist of Kesha's subsequent headlining tours since the song's release, including the Only Love Tour and The Tits Out Tour.

== Track listing ==
- Digital download – The Remixes
1. "Praying" (Frank Walker Remix) – 2:59
2. "Praying" (Oliver Nelson Remix) – 3:57
3. "Praying" (Tim Legend Remix) – 3:38

== Credits and personnel ==
Credits adapted from the liner notes of Rainbow.

Recording

- Engineered at The Village (Los Angeles, California), Studios 301 (Alexandria, Australia) and Robert Lang Studios (Shoreline, Washington)
- Mixed at Mirrorball Studios (North Hollywood, Los Angeles)

Personnel

- Kesha Sebert – writing, lead vocals
- Ben Abraham – writing
- Justin Armstrong – engineering
- Milo Eubank - engineering
- Heather Borror – violins
- Ingmar Carlson – assistant engineering
- Jon Castelli – engineering
- Billy Cenrenaro – engineering
- Hannah Crofts – backing vocals
- Rebecca Chung Filice – cello
- Christopher Foerstel – viola
- Antonia Gauci – engineering
- Andrew Joslyn – writing, strings, violins
- Andrew Kam – violins
- Ryan Lewis – writing, production
- Sarah Malmstorm – violins
- Seth May-Patterson – viola
- Georgia Mooney – backing vocals
- Ryan Nasci – engineering assistance
- Garrett Overcash – violins
- Elana Stone – backing vocals
- All Our Exes Live in Texas – backing vocals
- Eli Weinberger – cello
- Katherine Wighton – backing vocals

== Charts ==
=== Weekly charts ===
Weekly chart performance for "Praying"
Chart (2017–18)	Peak position
Australia (ARIA)	6
Austria (Ö3 Austria Top 40)	68
Belgium (Ultratip Bubbling Under Flanders)	19
Canada Hot 100 (Billboard)	11
Canada AC (Billboard)	27
Canada CHR/Top 40 (Billboard)	7
Canada Hot AC (Billboard)	13
Czech Republic Singles Digital (ČNS IFPI)	50
France Download (SNEP)	75
Hungary (Single Top 40)	13
Ireland (IRMA)	23
Japan Hot 100 (Billboard)	84
Netherlands (Dutch Global Top 40)	30
Netherlands (Single Tip)	4
New Zealand (Recorded Music NZ)	37
Portugal (AFP)	53
Scottish Singles Sales (Official Charts)	16
Slovakia Singles Digital (ČNS IFPI)	49
Sweden (Sverigetopplistan)	77
Switzerland (Schweizer Hitparade)	64
UK Singles (Official Charts)	26
US Billboard Hot 100	22
US Adult Contemporary (Billboard)	17
US Adult Pop Airplay (Billboard)	6
US Dance Airplay (Billboard)	14
US Pop Airplay (Billboard)	9

=== Year-end charts ===
Year-end chart performance for "Praying"
Chart (2017)	Position
Australia (ARIA)	58
Canada Hot 100 (Billboard)	63
US Billboard Hot 100	67
US Adult Pop Airplay (Billboard)	29
US Pop Airplay (Billboard)	39
US Radio Songs (Billboard)	55

== Certifications ==
Certifications for "Praying"
Region	Certification	Certified units/sales
Australia (ARIA)	4× Platinum	280,000^{‡}
Canada (Music Canada)	4× Platinum	320,000^{‡}
New Zealand (RMNZ)	2× Platinum	60,000^{‡}
United Kingdom (BPI)	Platinum	600,000^{‡}
United States (RIAA)	5× Platinum	5,000,000^{‡}
^{‡} Sales+streaming figures based on certification alone.

== Release history ==
Release dates and formats for "Praying"
Region	Date	Format	Version	Label(s)	Ref.
Various	July 6, 2017	Digital download	Original	Kemosabe	
Italy	July 14, 2017	Radio airplay	Original	Sony	
United States	July 18, 2017	Contemporary hit radio	Original	Kemosabe; RCA	
Various	September 29, 2017	Digital download	The Remixes	Kemosabe	
United States	October 16, 2017	Adult contemporary radio	Original	Kemosabe; RCA	

== See also ==
- List of top 10 singles for 2017 in Australia
