= North American Tour 2013 =

2013 concert tour by Kesha and Pitbull

- Continental tour by Pitbull and Kesha
- Poster for the North American leg
- Location: North America
- Associated album: Global Warming; Warrior
- Start date: May 23, 2013
- End date: June 28, 2013
- Legs: 1
- No. of shows: 22
Pitbull tour chronology
Planet Pit World Tour (2012)	North American Tour 2013 (2013)	Global Warming Tour (2013)
Kesha tour chronology
Get Sleazy Tour (2011)	North American Tour 2013 (2013)	Warrior Tour (2013–2015)

The North American Tour 2013 was a co-headlining concert tour by American rapper Pitbull and American singer Kesha. The tour promoted both Pitbull's album Global Warming and Kesha's album Warrior, which were both released in November 2012. Both Kesha and Pitbull officially announced the trek around North America on Friday, March 22, 2013. Although the tour's official name is the North American Tour, Pitbull and Kesha announced on August 5, 2013 that they are bringing the tour to Australia in late October and early November. The tour started on May 23, 2013 in Boston at the Comcast Center and came to a close on June 26, 2013 in Tampa, Florida at the Live Nation Amphitheatre.

== Background and development ==
Back in 2009, Kesha collaborated with Pitbull on a song called "Girls" which featured on his album Pitbull Starring in Rebelution. The two also paired up in 2009 for a remix of Kesha's first single, "Tik Tok". Since then both artists have released multiple albums including Pitbull's Global Warming and Kesha's Warrior that have each hit the top ten of Billboard 200. Pitbull and Kesha each have achieved many top ten hits on Billboard Hot 100 including each of their smash hit singles "Feel This Moment" (Pitbull) and "Die Young" (Kesha). Although the tour was officially announced on March 22, 2013, Kesha and Pitbull hinted at the joint tour on March 21, 2013 via Twitter. The conversation started when Pitbull tweeted to Kesha about the upcoming Kids Choice Awards, which they were both performing at, but separately. Pitbull asked "Oye Mamita @keshasuxx ! u ready 2 party at the #kidschoiceawards this weekend?" Then Kesha responded by saying, "born ready @Pitbull ...are u sure you can you handle this wild child?" After exchanging a couple more tweets about having a party on the dance floor and having a "pants off dance off", the conversation escalated when Pitbull asked Kesha, ".@keshasuxx Well what's going on this summer? Maybe we should hang out… and party". Kesha then responded by saying, "you know me and my #Animals would love that @Pitbull", which hinted at the tour, which was announced the next day.

Members of both Kesha's and Pitbull's fanclubs got a first chance at purchasing tickets for the tour on March 27, 2013, before the general public got a chance to purchase the tickets on March 29, 2013. Various local top 40 radio stations have been giving tickets away to promote the tour. MTV has also been promoting the tour due to the fact that Kesha's reality show, Kesha: My Crazy Beautiful Life, is being aired on the broadcasting station as its first season. To promote the tour even more, the pair teamed up for a remix of Kesha's latest single, "Crazy Kids".

On August 5, 2013 the duo announced that they would take the tour to Australia in late October and early November. The pre-sale for the tickets began on August 7, 2013 and ended on August 11, 2013, unless the pre-sale tickets sold out before then. The tickets for the pre-sale were only available to Visa Credit, Debit and Prepaid cardholders. The tickets became available to the general public on August 15, 2013. It was also announced on the 5th that the Justice Crew would join them as they traveled their way around Australia. Stops on the tour included Brisbane, Melbourne, Adelaide, Perth and Sydney.

On October 14, 2013, it was announced that the duo's Australian leg of the tour had been cancelled by the promoter due to low ticket sales. Just two weeks before they were set to take the stage in Australia, the duo had cancelled their tour, but after the statement was released both artists released their condolences to the fans.

== Broadcasts and recordings ==
On June 21, 2013, the television network, E!, announced that the network would broadcast the tour on their network as a part of E!'s Inside Track Summer Concert Series. The series is a collaboration with Live Nation. The network filmed the show in Detroit at The Palace of Auburn Hills on June 7, 2013. The recording was aired as the first installment of the series on June 21, 2013. To promote the broadcasting, E! interviewed Kesha an hour before the show at The Palace of Auburn Hills. In the interview, Kesha conversed with the interviewer about her favorite and least favorite parts of the tour, costumes she wears for the tour, and her golden tooth that she has from an accident at a bar. E! also interviewed Kesha's stage manager, Justin De Meulenaere, before the show. Meulenaere, who is also known as "Boot", is most known for his work with Kesha on her previous concert tour, the Get Sleazy Tour.

== Setlist ==
Kesha
1. "Warrior"
2. "Crazy Kids"
3. "We R Who We R"
4. "Blow"
5. "Gold Trans Am"
6. "Dirty Love"
7. "Take It Off"
8. "C'Mon"
9. "Last Goodbye"
10. "Machine Gun Love"
11. "Blah Blah Blah"
12. "Your Love Is My Drug"
13. "Tik Tok"

Encore

14. "Die Young"
Pitbull
1. "Hey Baby (Drop It to the Floor)"
2. "International Love"
3. "I Like How It Feels" / "Dance Again" / "Move Shake Drop"
4. "Shut It Down"
5. "Live It Up" / "Get It Started"
6. "Rain Over Me" / "Throw Your Hands Up (Dancar Kuduro)" / "Echa Pa'lla (Manos Pa'rriba)" / "Bon, Bon"
7. "Back in Time"
8. "Don't Stop the Party"
9. "Crazy People" / "Shake Señora" / "Shake (Mentirosa)"
10. "Culo"
11. "I Know You Want Me (Calle Ocho)"
12. "On the Floor" / "I Like It" / "DJ Got Us Fallin' in Love"
13. "Hotel Room Service"

Encore

14. "Feel This Moment"
15. "Give Me Everything"

== Tour dates ==
Date	City	Country	Venue	Opening act
North America
May 23, 2013	Mansfield	United States	Comcast Center	Justice Crew
May 25, 2013	Atlantic City	United States	Golden Nugget Atlantic City	Justice Crew
May 26, 2013	Atlantic City	United States	Golden Nugget Atlantic City	Justice Crew
May 31, 2013	Holmdel Township	United States	PNC Bank Arts Center	Justice Crew
June 1, 2013	Wantagh	United States	Nikon at Jones Beach Theater	Justice Crew
June 2, 2013	Burgettstown	United States	First Niagara Pavilion	Justice Crew
June 4, 2013	Montreal	Canada	Bell Centre	Jump Smokers!
June 5, 2013	Toronto	Canada	Molson Canadian Amphitheatre	Jump Smokers!
June 7, 2013	Auburn Hills	United States	The Palace of Auburn Hills	Justice Crew
June 9, 2013	Tinley Park	United States	First Midwest Bank Amphitheatre	Justice Crew
June 11, 2013	Denver	United States	Fiddler's Green Amphitheatre	Justice Crew
June 14, 2013	Mountain View	United States	Shoreline Amphitheatre	Justice Crew
June 15, 2013	Las Vegas	United States	Mandalay Bay Events Center	Justice Crew
June 16, 2013	Wheatland	United States	Sleep Train Amphitheatre	Justice Crew
June 18, 2013	Los Angeles	United States	Hollywood Bowl	Justice Crew
June 19, 2013	Phoenix	United States	Ak-Chin Pavilion	Justice Crew
June 20, 2013	Albuquerque	United States	Isleta Amphitheater	Justice Crew
June 22, 2013	The Woodlands	United States	Cynthia Woods Mitchell Pavilion	Justice Crew
June 23, 2013	Dallas	United States	Gexa Energy Pavilion	Justice Crew
June 24, 2013	San Antonio	United States	AT&T Center	Justice Crew
June 27, 2013	Atlanta	United States	Aaron's Amphitheatre at Lakewood	Justice Crew
June 28, 2013	Tampa	United States	Live Nation Amphitheatre	Justice Crew

Cancellations and rescheduled shows

October 30, 2013	Brisbane, Australia	Brisbane Entertainment Centre	Cancelled
November 1, 2013	Melbourne, Australia	Rod Laver Arena	Cancelled
November 3, 2013	Adelaide, Australia	Adelaide Entertainment Centre	Cancelled
November 5, 2013	Perth, Australia	Perth Arena	Cancelled
November 8, 2013	Sydney, Australia	Allphones Arena	Cancelled

=== Box office score data ===
Venue	City	Tickets sold / available	Gross revenuee
Bell Centre	Montreal	7,762 / 9,541 (81%)	$543,356
