= Warrior Tour =

2013–15 concert tour by Kesha

- World tour by Kesha
- Location: Asia; Europe; North America; South America
- Associated album: Warrior
- Start date: July 3, 2013
- End date: September 19, 2015
- Legs: 4
- No. of shows: 59
- Supporting acts: Fuse ODG; Raego; Mista; Semi Precious Weapons; Mike Posner; DJ Karma; Claudia Leitte; Capital Inicial; Chris Defreyn

Kesha concert chronology
- North American Tour 2013 (2013); Warrior Tour (2013–2015); Kesha and the Creepies: Fuck the World Tour (2016)

The Warrior Tour was the second headlining concert tour by American singer Kesha, in support of her sophomore studio album, Warrior (2012). The tour started on July 3, 2013, and concluded on September 19, 2015.

== Background and development ==
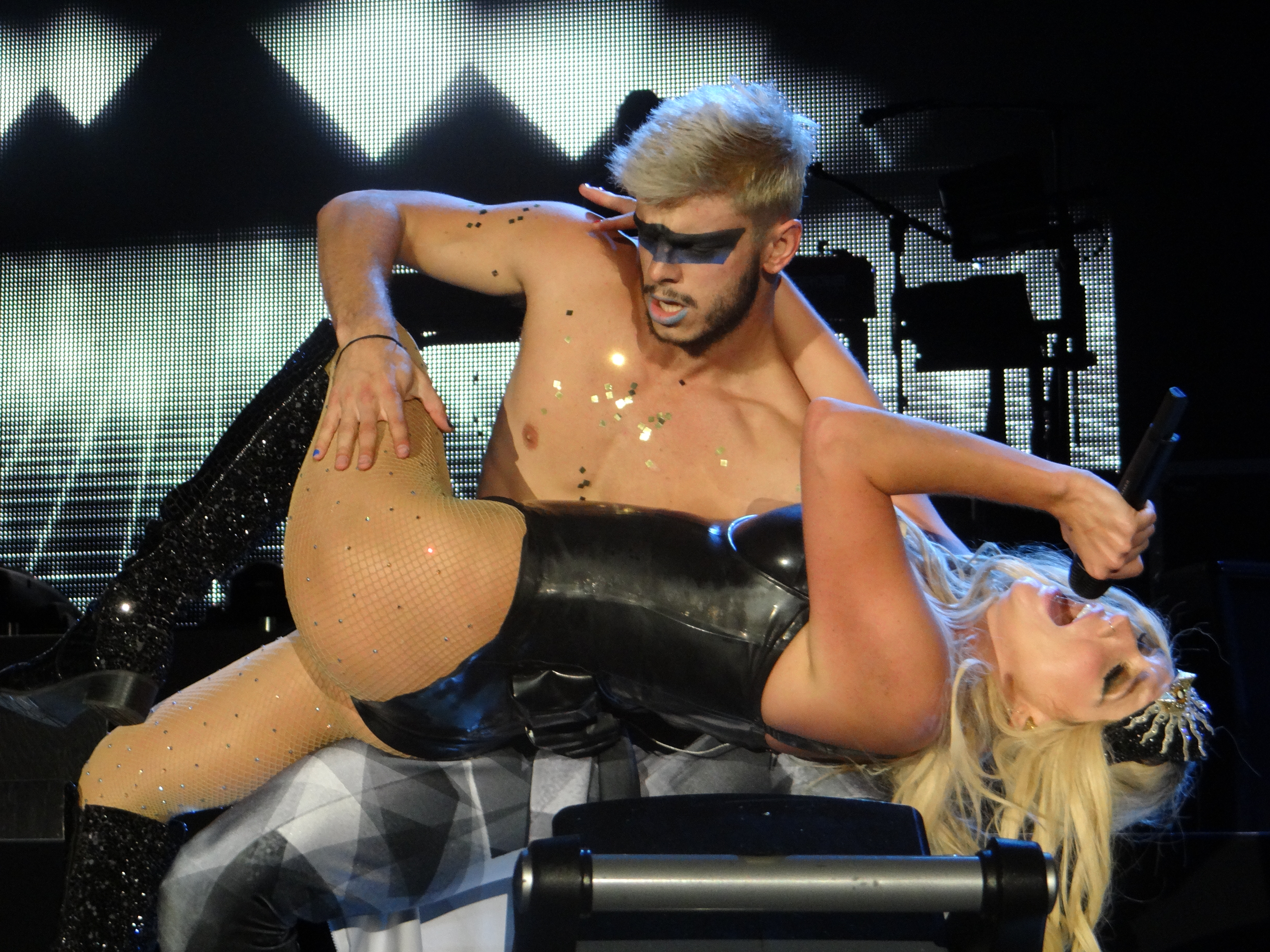
Kesha performing "Supernatural" in Charlotte, NC

In late March, Kesha and American rapper Pitbull announced that they would tour North America together on their North American Tour 2013. The joint tour was officially announced on March 22, 2013, but the two hinted at the tour on March 21, 2013, via Twitter. Shortly after tickets were available for the duo's summer tour, Kesha announced a separate tour that would visit Europe and other places she did not visit with Pitbull. The tickets for the European leg of the tour went on-sale shortly after the dates were announced. A couple weeks later, on May 13, 2013, North American dates were added to the tour. Kesha announced the pre-sale password for the North American dates via Twitter after the fourth episode of her television show, Kesha: My Crazy Beautiful Life, aired on May 16, 2013. The tickets went on sale to the general public on May 17, 2013. Leading up to the tour, Kesha has been using the website Mobio Insider to connect with her fans and give them details about the tour. Kesha has been promoting the tour mainly through her Twitter and Facebook accounts.

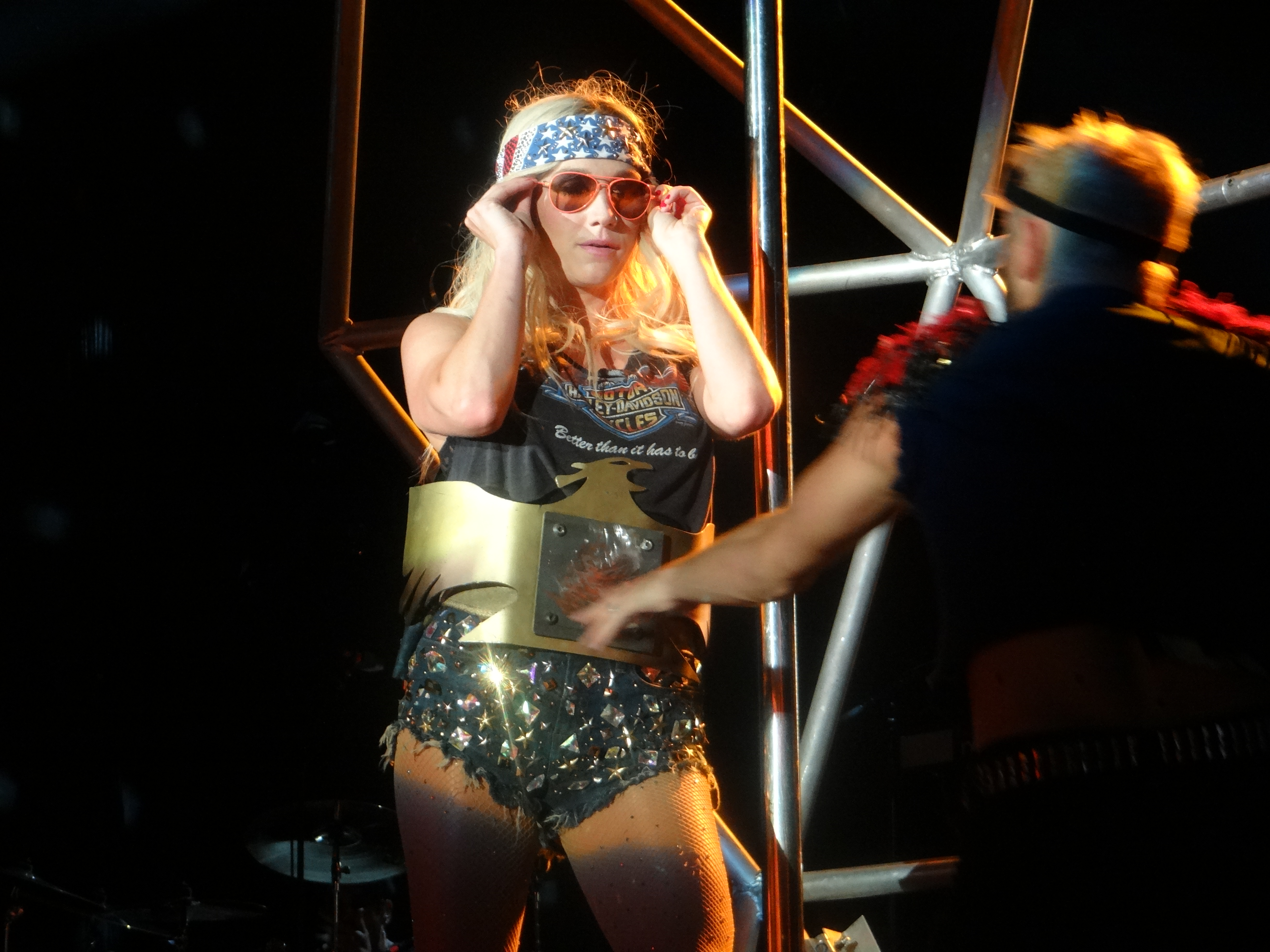
Kesha performing "Gold Trans Am" in Charlotte, NC

Aside from the social media promotion, Kesha has also promoted the tour through the application, Blippar. When scanning Kesha's symbol, fans can access many special features including the chance to win tickets to any of the dates on the North American leg. Many of the dates are a part of festivals and fairs including the Live at the Marquee Festival in Cork, Ireland, the Wireless Festival in London, England, the Illinois State Fair in Springfield, Illinois, and a few others.

In October 2014, Kesha brought back the Warrior Tour setlist and costumes to perform for a music festival in Shanghai, China. After that, the tour was revisited and traveled throughout South and North America with new songs, visuals, and costumes added to the tour through January to September 2015.

== Broadcasts and recordings ==
On June 21, 2013, the television network, E!, announced that the network would broadcast a show from one of the co-headlining dates Kesha was on with Pitbull. The show would be broadcast as a part of E!'s Inside Track Summer Concert Series. The series is a collaboration with Live Nation. The network filmed the show in Detroit at The Palace of Auburn Hills on June 7, 2013. The recording was aired as the first installment of the series on June 21, 2013. To promote the broadcasting, E! interviewed Kesha an hour before the show at The Palace of Auburn Hills. In the interview, Kesha conversed with the interviewer about her favorite and least favorite parts of the tour, costumes she wears for the tour, and her golden tooth that she has from an accident at a bar. E! also interviewed Kesha's stage manager, Justin De Meulenaere, before the show. Meulenaere, who is also known as "Boot", is most known for his work with Kesha on her previous concert tour, the Get Sleazy Tour.

== Set list ==
This set list is representative of the performance in Stockholm. It does not represent all concerts for the duration of the tour.

1. "Warrior"
2. "Crazy Kids"
3. "We R Who We R"
4. "Blow" (contains elements of the Cirkut Remix)
5. "Dirty Love"
6. "Gold Trans Am"
7. "Take It Off" (rock version)
8. "C'Mon"
9. "Thinking of You"
10. "Machine Gun Love"
11. "Last Goodbye"
12. "Love Into the Light"
13. "Supernatural"
14. "Blah Blah Blah"
15. "Your Love Is My Drug"
16. "Tik Tok"

Encore

17. "Die Young"
Notes
- "Party at a Rich Dude's House", "Animal" and "Supernatural" were performed on select shows during the second leg.
- "Last Goodbye" was performed in place of "Machine Gun Love" on select dates of the first North American leg.
- "Supernatural", "Last Goodbye", and "Love Into the Light" were performed on June 8, 2013 in Cincinnati.
- "Thinking of You", "Last Goodbye", "Love Into the Light" and "Supernatural" were all performed during select shows in Europe.
- Joan Jett joined Kesha on September 21, 2013 in Las Vegas to perform "Bad Reputation".
- "Timber" was added to the setlist from October 6, 2014.

== Tour dates ==
Date	City	Country	Venue	Opening acts
Europe
July 3, 2013^{[B]}	Cork	Ireland	The Dockland	—N/a
July 5, 2013^{[C]}	Werchter	Belgium	Werchter Festival Grounds	—N/a
July 6, 2013^{[D]}	Nibe	Denmark	Skalskoven	—N/a
July 7, 2013	Stockholm	Sweden	Stora Scen	—N/a
July 9, 2013	Amsterdam	Netherlands	Paradiso	—N/a
July 10, 2013	Luxembourg City	Luxembourg	Den Atelier	—N/a
July 12, 2013^{[E]}	London	England	Queen Elizabeth Olympic Park	—N/a
July 13, 2013^{[F]}	Kinross	Scotland	Balado	—N/a
July 15, 2013	London	England	O_{2} Academy Brixton	Fuse ODG
July 16, 2013	Paris	France	Le Trianon	—N/a
July 18, 2013	Prague	Czech Republic	Club SaSaZu	Raego; Mista
July 19, 2013	Vienna	Austria	Bank Austria Halle	—N/a
North America
August 9, 2013	Windsor	Canada	The Colosseum at Caesars Windsor	Semi Precious Weapons; Mike Posner
August 10, 2013^{[G]}	Bethlehem	United States	Sands Steel Stage	Semi Precious Weapons; Mike Posner
August 12, 2013	Wolf Trap	United States	Filene Center	Semi Precious Weapons; Mike Posner
August 14, 2013	Raleigh	United States	Red Hat Amphitheater	Semi Precious Weapons; Mike Posner
August 15, 2013	Charlotte	United States	Time Warner Cable Music Pavilion	Semi Precious Weapons; Mike Posner
August 17, 2013^{[H]}	Springfield	United States	Illinois State Fair Grandstand	Semi Precious Weapons; Mike Posner
August 18, 2013	Lincoln	United States	Pershing Center	Semi Precious Weapons; Mike Posner
August 19, 2013	Minneapolis	United States	Myth Nightclub	Semi Precious Weapons; Mike Posner
August 21, 2013	Milwaukee	United States	Eagles Ballroom	Semi Precious Weapons; Mike Posner
August 23, 2013	Uncasville	United States	Mohegan Sun Arena	Semi Precious Weapons; Mike Posner
August 24, 2013^{[I]}	Essex Junction	United States	Coca-Cola Grandstand	Semi Precious Weapons; Mike Posner
August 25, 2013	Canandaigua	United States	Constellation Brands – Marvin Sands Performing Arts Center	Semi Precious Weapons; Mike Posner
August 27, 2013	Columbus	United States	Lifestyle Communities Pavilion	Semi Precious Weapons; Mike Posner
August 28, 2013	Portsmouth	United States	nTelos Wireless Pavilion	Semi Precious Weapons; Mike Posner
August 30, 2013	Bangor	United States	Darling's Waterfront Pavilion	Semi Precious Weapons; Mike Posner
August 31, 2013	Gilford	United States	Bank of New Hampshire Pavilion	Semi Precious Weapons; Mike Posner
September 1, 2013	Las Vegas	United States	1 OAK Nightclub	DJ Karma
September 7, 2013^{[J]}	Pomona	United States	Fairplex Park Budweiser Grandstand	Semi Precious Weapons; Mike Posner
September 21, 2013^{[K]}	Las Vegas	United States	MGM Grand Garden Arena	—N/a
September 25, 2013	Kingston	United States	Ryan Center	Semi Precious Weapons; Mike Posner
September 27, 2013	Baltimore	United States	Pier Six Pavilion	Semi Precious Weapons; Mike Posner
September 29, 2013	Ithaca	United States	Barton Hall	Semi Precious Weapons; Mike Posner
Asia
October 24, 2013	Quezon City	Philippines	Smart Araneta Coliseum	—N/a
November 12, 2013	Tokyo	Japan	Zepp Tokyo	—N/a
November 13, 2013	Tokyo	Japan	Zepp Tokyo	—N/a
November 15, 2013	Osaka	Japan	Namba Hatch	—N/a
November 17, 2013^{[L]}	Mumbai	India	Taj Mahal Palace Ballroom	—N/a
October 6, 2014^{[M]}	Shanghai	China	Xuhui Binjiang Green Space	—N/a
South America
January 22, 2015	Salvador	Brazil	Festival de Verão de Salvador	Claudia Leitte; Capital Inicial
January 25, 2015	São Paulo	Brazil	Citibank Hall	—N/a
January 30, 2015	Florianópolis	Brazil	Devassa on Stage	Chris Defreyn
January 31, 2015	Xangri-lá	Brazil	Planeta Atlântida	—N/a
North America
March 7, 2015	Amherst	United States	William D. Mullins Memorial Center	—N/a
April 16, 2015	New York City	United States	Delete Blood Cancer	—N/a
April 17, 2015	Philadelphia	United States	Franklin Field	—N/a
April 18, 2015	Auburn	United States	Auburn University	—N/a
April 21, 2015	Washington, D.C.	United States	The Black Cat	—N/a
April 23, 2015	Garden City	United States	Adelphi University	—N/a
April 25, 2015	Medford	United States	Tufts University	—N/a
April 26, 2015	Baltimore	United States	University of Maryland	—N/a
April 29, 2015	Greenvale	United States	Tiles Center for Performing Arts	—N/a
May 23, 2015	Las Vegas	United States	Hard Rock Hotel and Casino	—N/a
June 12, 2015^{[N]}	Los Angeles	United States	West Hollywood Park	—N/a
June 13, 2015^{[N]}	Los Angeles	United States	West Hollywood Park	—N/a
June 14, 2015^{[N]}	Los Angeles	United States	West Hollywood Park	—N/a
July 5, 2015	Las Vegas	United States	Hard Rock Hotel and Casino	—N/a
September 19, 2015	Clemson	United States	Upper Intramural Fields	—N/a

== Cancelled shows ==
List of cancelled concerts, showing date, city, country, venue, and reason for cancellation
Date	City	Country	Venue	Reason
July 21, 2013	Istanbul	Turkey	Parkorman	Health concerns
August 9, 2013	Cleveland	United States	Jacobs Pavilion at Nautica	Health concerns
October 22, 2013	Jakarta	Indonesia	Skenoo Exhibition Hall	Health concerns
October 26, 2013	Kuala Lumpur	Malaysia	Stadium Negara	Health concerns
February 13, 2014	Dubai	United Arab Emirates	Dubai Media City Amphitheatre	Health concerns
March 15, 2014	Hammond	United States	Horeshoe Casino Hammond	Health concerns
April 13, 2014	Green Bay	United States	Kress Events Center	Health concerns

== Notes ==
- B The show in Cork, Ireland is a part of Live at the Marquee.
- C The show in Werchter, Belgium is a part of Rock Werchter 2013.
- D The show in Nibe, Denmark is a part of the Nibe Festival.
- E The show in London, England on July 12, 2013 is a part of the Wireless Festival.
- F The show in Kinross, Scotland is a part of T in the Park.
- G The show in Bethlehem, Pennsylvania is a part of Musikfest 2013.
- H The show in Springfield, Illinois is a part of the Illinois State Fair.
- I The show in Essex Junction, Vermont is a part of the Champlain Valley Fair.
- J The show in Pomona, California is a part of the Los Angeles County Fair.
- K The show in Las Vegas, Nevada is a part of iHeartRadio's Music Festival 2013.
- L The show in Mumbai, India is a part of the American Foundation for AIDS Research Gala.
- M The show in Shanghai, China is a part of the Storm Electronic Music Festival.
- N These shows in Los Angeles were part of LA Pride.
