= The End Is the Beginning (disambiguation) =

"The End Is the Beginning" is an episode of the television series Fear the Walking Dead.

The End Is the Beginning may also refer to:

== Television episodes ==
- "The End Is the Beginning" (Kesha: My Crazy Beautiful Life)
- "The End Is the Beginning" (Star Trek: Picard)
- "The End Is the Beginning" (Voltron: Legendary Defender)

== Other media ==
- The End Is the Beginning, an album by Joel Futterman, 1980
- "The End Is the Beginning", a song by Two Steps from Hell from SkyWorld, 2012
- "The End Is the Beginning", the third section of the 1981 novel The Quiet Earth by Craig Harrison
- Dark Avengers: The End Is the Beginning, a 2013 collected edition of Dark Avengers comics

== See also ==
- "The End Is the Beginning Is the End", a 1997 song by the Smashing Pumpkins
- "The End Is the Beginning Is the End" (Grey's Anatomy), a television episode
- The End of the Beginning (disambiguation)
- The Beginning of the End (disambiguation)
