= The Beginning and the End =

"The Beginning and the End" may refer to:

- The Beginning and the End (Bizzy Bone album), 2004
- The Beginning and the End (Clifford Brown album), 1973
- The Beginning and the End (1960 film), an Egyptian film
- The Beginning and the End (1993 film), a Mexican film
- The Beginning and the End (novel), by Naguib Mahfouz
- "The Beginning and the End" (Millennium), an episode from season two of the TV fictional mystery series Millennium
- The Beginning and the End, or "Knockin' on Heaven's Door", an episode of Neon Genesis Evangelion
- "The Beginning and the End", a song by Orchestral Manoeuvres in the Dark from the album Architecture & Morality
- "The Beginning and the End", a song by Isis from the album Oceanic
- Al-Bidaya wa l-Nihaya or The Beginning and the End, an Islamic historical chronicle book by Ibn Kathir

== See also ==
- The Beginning of the End (disambiguation)
- Alpha and Omega, an appellation of God in the Book of Revelation
- First and Last (disambiguation)
