= The End of the Beginning =

The End of the Beginning may refer to:

- A quotation from a 1942 speech by Winston Churchill concerning the Second Battle of El Alamein

== Literature ==
- End of the Beginning (novel), a 2005 Days of Infamy novel by Harry Turtledove
- The End of the Beginning (play), a 1937 play by Sean O'Casey
- "The End of the Beginning", a short story by Ray Bradbury, included in his 1959 collection A Medicine for Melancholy

== Music ==
=== Albums ===
- The End of the Beginning (God Is an Astronaut album) or the title song, 2002
- The End of the Beginning (Judie Tzuke album), 2004
- The End of the Beginning (Like a Storm album) or the title song, 2009
- The End of the Beginning (Murs album), 2003
- The End of the Beginning, by Richie Havens, 1976
- The End of the Beginning, a video by Sabbat, 1990

=== Songs ===
- "End of the Beginning" (song), by Black Sabbath, 2013
- "End of the Beginning", by Jason Becker from Perspective, 1996
- "End of the Beginning", by 30 Seconds to Mars from 30 Seconds to Mars, 2002
- "End of the Beginning", by David Phelps
- "The End of the Beginning", the alternative title to Pink Floyd's "A Saucerful of Secrets" segment in their 1969 concept tour The Man and The Journey
- "End of Beginning", by Djo from Decide, 2022

== Television episodes ==
- "End of the Beginning" (Agents of S.H.I.E.L.D.)
- "The End of the Beginning" (Hercules: The Legendary Journeys)
- "The End of the Beginning", an episode of The Bold Type
- "End of the Beginning", an episode of The Brothers
- "The End of the Beginning", an episode of The Fosters
- "End of the Beginning" (The Umbrella Academy)

== See also ==
- The Beginning of the End (disambiguation)
- The End Is the Beginning (disambiguation)
