= C'Mon (Kesha song) =

2013 single by Kesha

Single by Kesha

from the album Warrior
- B-side: "Die Young" (Deconstructed mix)
- Released: January 7, 2013
- Recorded: 2012
- Studio: Luke's in the Boo, Studio Malibu (Malibu, California); Record Plant (Hollywood, California); Westlake Studios (West Hollywood, California)
- Genre: Techno-pop; dance; pop-rap
- Length: 3:34
- Label: Kemosabe; RCA
- Songwriters: Kesha Sebert; Lukasz Gottwald; Benjamin Levin; Max Martin; Bonnie McKee; Henry Walter
- Producers: Dr. Luke; Benny Blanco; Cirkut

Kesha singles chronology
"Die Young" (2012)	"C'Mon" (2013)	"Crazy Kids" (2013)

Music video
- "C'Mon" on YouTube

"C'Mon" is a song by American singer Kesha from her second studio album, Warrior (2012). Initially released as a promotional single under Kemosabe Records on November 16, 2012, it was officially released as the album's second single on January 7, 2013, in the United States. It also impacted contemporary hit radio the following day. The song was written by Kesha, Dr. Luke, Benny Blanco, Max Martin, Cirkut, and fellow pop singer and longtime collaborator Bonnie McKee, while production was handled by Dr. Luke, Blanco, and Cirkut. Containing elements of pop rap, "C'Mon" is a techno-pop and dance song with brash lyrics that center on partying and falling in love. Stylistically, the song follows a verse-chorus pattern typical in pop music, with Kesha adding traditional singing in the latter and the discordant enunciation and stresses of vowels to force assonance and rhyme that epitomize her rap technique in the former.

The song peaked at number twenty-seven on the Billboard Hot 100, becoming Kesha's first solo single to miss the top ten. However, the single did peak at number nine on the Billboard Pop Songs Chart. "C'Mon" was certified platinum by the Recording Industry Association of America (RIAA). In Australia, the song obtained moderate success, gaining a Platinum certification with digital sales brimming 70,000 units.

The song's music video was filmed in December 2012, and premiered on Kesha's VEVO channel on YouTube on January 11, 2013, garnering over 54 million views as of June 2026.

It was also included on the fifth edition of the Just Dance series, Just Dance 2014.

== Background and composition ==
"C'Mon"
In "C'Mon", the artist shifts vocal techniques from tradition singing to rapping between the refrains and verses, depicting discordant stresses on ending consonances with mid-word enunciation to force assonance that have become her signature.

"C'Mon" was written by Kesha, Dr. Luke, Max Martin, Bonnie McKee, Benny Blanco, Melin Shikder, and Cirkut, while production was helmed by Dr. Luke, Martin, Cirkut, and Blanco. Registered on the Broadcast Music Incorporated database on October 13, 2012, under the legal title "C Mon", the song was released as the second single from Kesha's second studio album, Warrior. "C'Mon" is a techno-pop and pop-rap record thematically similar to Kesha's previous single, "Die Young"; Billboard called the song "a YOLO dance jam about taking hookups from the dance floor to the bedroom", while MTV called the track a "...case for a sassy one-night stand." The track begins with harmonized, a cappella male vocals, before breaking into a "crunchy" beat. In "C'Mon"'s verse, Kesha sings: "Saw you leaning against that old record machine/ Saw the name of your band written on the marquee/ It's a full moon tonight so we gettin' rowdy/ Yeah, we gettin' rowdy, get-get-gettin' rowdy." The refrain is sung with the lyrics: "C'mon 'cause I know what I like/ And you're looking just like my type/ Let's go for it just for tonight/ C'mon, c'mon, c'mon/ Now don't even try to deny/ We're both going home satisfied/ Let's go for it just for tonight/ C'mon, c'mon, c'mon".

According to the sheet music published at Musicnotes.com, "C'Mon" is written in the key of E major and has a moderate tempo of 126 beats per minute. The song follows a chord progression E–A–C♯m–A, and Kesha's vocals span from B_{3} to E_{5}.

== Critical reception ==
Seventeen gave a positive review of both the song and the video, calling "C'Mon" a "perfect dance jam with a catchy chorus". The Huffington Post praised the song, calling the chorus "awesome", and stating it could be Kesha's "latest destined-for-smash-y song". Billboard gave a positive review of the song, comparing it to Robyn's "Call Your Girlfriend", as well as Kesha's previous hit "Your Love Is My Drug". Contessa Gayles of AOL said "C'Mon" stayed true to Kesha's trademark half-rapping, half-singing style. Fuse gave the track a positive review, stating that fans of the un-Auto-Tuned "Die Young" would find similar gems in "C'Mon". Mark Hogan blogging for Spin wrote that although Kesha's hedonistic persona in "C'Mon" was marketable, it remained an ordinary electropop song better suited for label-mate Katy Perry, adding that Kesha's party-goer shtick present in previous hits "Tik Tok" and "Take It Off" was starting to become more of a caricature with the release of "C'Mon".

== Commercial performance ==
Weeks prior to being released officially to radio stations in the U.S., "C'Mon" debuted at number 99 on the Billboard Hot 100 and 28 on the Billboard Pop Songs Chart. Upon the release, the song debuted at number 70 on the Digital Songs with 60,000 copies sold. It peaked at number 27 on the Billboard Hot 100, becoming her first solo single to not chart within the top ten in the United States. Within its first month of release, "C'Mon" had sold 350,000 copies. As of December 13, 2018, the song received a platinum certification in the United States by the nation's Recording Industry Association of America (RIAA), for reaching sales of 1 million units in the country alone.

The song had limited chart success in Europe; Ireland is the only country in which it charted well, reaching number 33. On the UK Singles Chart, it peaked at 70, but her follow-up single, "Crazy Kids", was more successful across the continent.

== Music video ==
On December 22, 2012, Kesha confirmed that she was filming the "C'Mon" music video when she posted a picture of herself on set on her Twitter account. The "Awful House" scenes were filmed at the historic Elliston Soda Shop in Nashville, TN. When Kesha quits her job and walks out the front door of "Awful House" in the video, other local businesses on Ellison Place can be seen, albeit out-of-focus. The music video for "C'Mon" was released on January 11, 2013. The music video has surpassed 50 million views on her Vevo channel.

=== Synopsis ===
The video opens with Kesha working as waitress at a waffle house named the "Awful House". Wearing pink ribbons, a pink-checkered shirt, and "daisy duke" shorts, Kesha quits her job and jumps into a van called the "Dream Machine" driven by someone in a cat costume. Switching costumes into what MTV considered something more in-tune with Kesha's style, the rapper terrorizes a convenience store with a gang of people dressed in animal costumes. The following scenes depict Kesha on a motorcycle and taking a bath.

=== Lyric video ===
The official lyric video was released on December 12, 2012.

== Live performances ==
Kesha performed "C'Mon" at The X Factor on December 6, 2012, and at MTV's NYE Countdown on January 1, 2013. Kesha also performed "C'Mon" on The Jonathan Ross Show on February 16, 2013, and on Late Night with Jimmy Fallon on February 20, 2013. On March 23, 2013, at the 2013 Kids' Choice Awards, Kesha performed a segment of "We R Who We R" and "C'Mon". Additionally, Kesha performed "C'Mon" at the 2013 Calzedonia Fashion Show. The song was also included in the North American Tour 2013, Kesha's first coheadlining concert tour, and the Warrior Tour, Kesha's second headlining concert tour.

== Credits and personnel ==
- Vocals – Kesha
- Songwriting – Kesha Sebert, Lukasz Gottwald, Benjamin Levin, Max Martin, Bonnie McKee, Henry Walter
- Production – Dr. Luke, Benny Blanco, Cirkut

Credits adapted from the liner notes on BMI.

== Track listings ==
- Digital download
1. "C'Mon" – 3:34
- Digital download (remixes EP)
1. "C'Mon" – 3:34
2. "C'Mon" (Wideboys club mix) – 5:51
3. "C'Mon" (Wideboys radio mix) – 3:52
4. "C'Mon" (Cutmore club mix) – 6:08
5. "C'Mon" (Cutmore radio mix) – 3:57
- CD
1. "C'Mon" – 3:34
2. "Die Young" (Deconstructed mix) – 3:21

== Charts ==
=== Weekly charts ===
Weekly chart performance for "C'Mon"
Chart (2013)	Peak position
Australia (ARIA)	19
Austria (Ö3 Austria Top 40)	64
Belgium (Ultratip Bubbling Under Flanders)	4
Belgium (Ultratip Bubbling Under Wallonia)	6
CIS Airplay (TopHit)	119
Canada Hot 100 (Billboard)	16
Canada CHR/Top 40 (Billboard)	11
Canada Hot AC (Billboard)	15
Czech Republic Airplay (ČNS IFPI)	49
France (SNEP)	181
Germany (GfK)	79
Global Dance Songs (Billboard)	13
Ireland (IRMA)	33
Italy Airplay (EarOne)	54
Italy (FIMI)	91
Japan Hot 100 (Billboard)	73
New Zealand (Recorded Music NZ)	22
Russia Airplay (TopHit)	114
Scottish Singles Sales (Official Charts)	42
Slovakia Airplay (ČNS IFPI)	56
South Korea (Circle)	103
South Korea Foreign (Circle)	2
UK Singles (Official Charts)	70
US Billboard Hot 100	27
US Adult Pop Airplay (Billboard)	27
US Dance Club Songs (Billboard)	16
US Dance Airplay (Billboard)	14
US Pop Airplay (Billboard)	9
US Rhythmic Airplay (Billboard)	27

=== Year-end charts ===
Year-end chart performance for "C'Mon"
Chart (2013)	Position
Canada Hot 100 (Billboard)	85
South Korea Foreign (Circle)	144

== Certifications and sales ==
Certifications and sales for "C'Mon"
Region	Certification	Certified units/sales
Australia (ARIA)	Platinum	70,000^{‡}
New Zealand (RMNZ)	Gold	7,500^{*}
South Korea (Circle)	—	40,000
United States (RIAA)	Platinum	1,000,000^{‡}
^{*} Sales figures based on certification alone.^{‡} Sales+streaming figures based on certification alone.

== Release history ==
"C'Mon" release history
Region	Date	Format(s)	Format	Label	Ref.
Australia	November 16, 2012	Digital download	Original	Kemosabe	
New Zealand	November 16, 2012	Digital download	Original	Kemosabe	
United States	January 8, 2013	Contemporary hit radio	Original	RCA	
United States	January 28, 2013	Adult contemporary radio; hot adult contemporary radio; modern adult contemporary radio	Original	RCA	
Various	March 1, 2013	Digital download	Remixes EP	Kemosabe	
Italy	March 1, 2013	Radio airplay	Original	Sony	
Germany	March 15, 2013	Digital download	Original	Kemosabe	
Germany	March 29, 2013	CD	Original	RCA	
Taiwan	April 2, 2013	CD	Original	RCA	
