= Crazy Kids =

2013 single by Kesha featuring will.i.am or Juicy J

- The single cover for the will.i.am version

Single by Kesha featuring will.i.am or Juicy J

from the album Warrior
- Released: April 29, 2013
- Recorded: June 2012
- Studio: Blackbird Studio (Nashville, TN); Luke's in the Boo (Malibu, CA); Studio Malibu (Malibu, CA); Record Plant (Los Angeles, CA)
- Genre: Synth-pop; pop rap
- Length: 3:49
- Label: Kemosabe; RCA
- Songwriters: Kesha; Lukasz Gottwald; William Adams; Jordan Houston; Henry Walter; Benjamin Levin
- Producers: Dr. Luke; Cirkut; Benny Blanco

Kesha singles chronology
| "C'Mon" (2012) | "Crazy Kids" (2013) | "Timber" (2013) |

will.i.am singles chronology
| "#thatPower" (2013) | "Crazy Kids" (2013) | "Bang Bang" (2013) |

Juicy J singles chronology
| "Pour It Up (Remix)" (2013) | "Crazy Kids" (2013) | "Bounce It" (2013) |

Music video
- "Crazy Kids" on YouTube

"Crazy Kids" is a song by American singer Kesha. It was released on April 29, 2013, as the third and final single from her second album Warrior (2012), with American rappers will.i.am or Juicy J as the featured artist depending on the version. An additional remix surfaced online featuring American rapper Pitbull. The lyrics were written by Kesha with assistance with Dr. Luke, Benny Blanco, Cirkut, who also helmed production of the track. Each featured artist wrote their own contribution.

Featuring whistling, the song is of the synthpop and hip hop genres. A music video for the track premiered on MTV on May 28, 2013, followed by the finale of her television documentary, Kesha: My Crazy Beautiful Life. The song was met with mixed reviews upon release, with will.i.am's addition to the song being criticized, while positive reactions for the music video followed, accompanied by comparisons between her Riff Raff and Brooke Candy.

Worldwide, the song has reached moderate success. The record peaked at 27 in the UK Singles Chart. In the United States, the song entered Billboard Hot 100 at number 59 and peaked at number 40 and entered the Mainstream Top 40 at number 22, eventually peaking at number 19. The record reached 14 in the charts in both Ireland and Lebanon. "Crazy Kids" is also certified Platinum in the US and Australia.

== Background and remixes ==
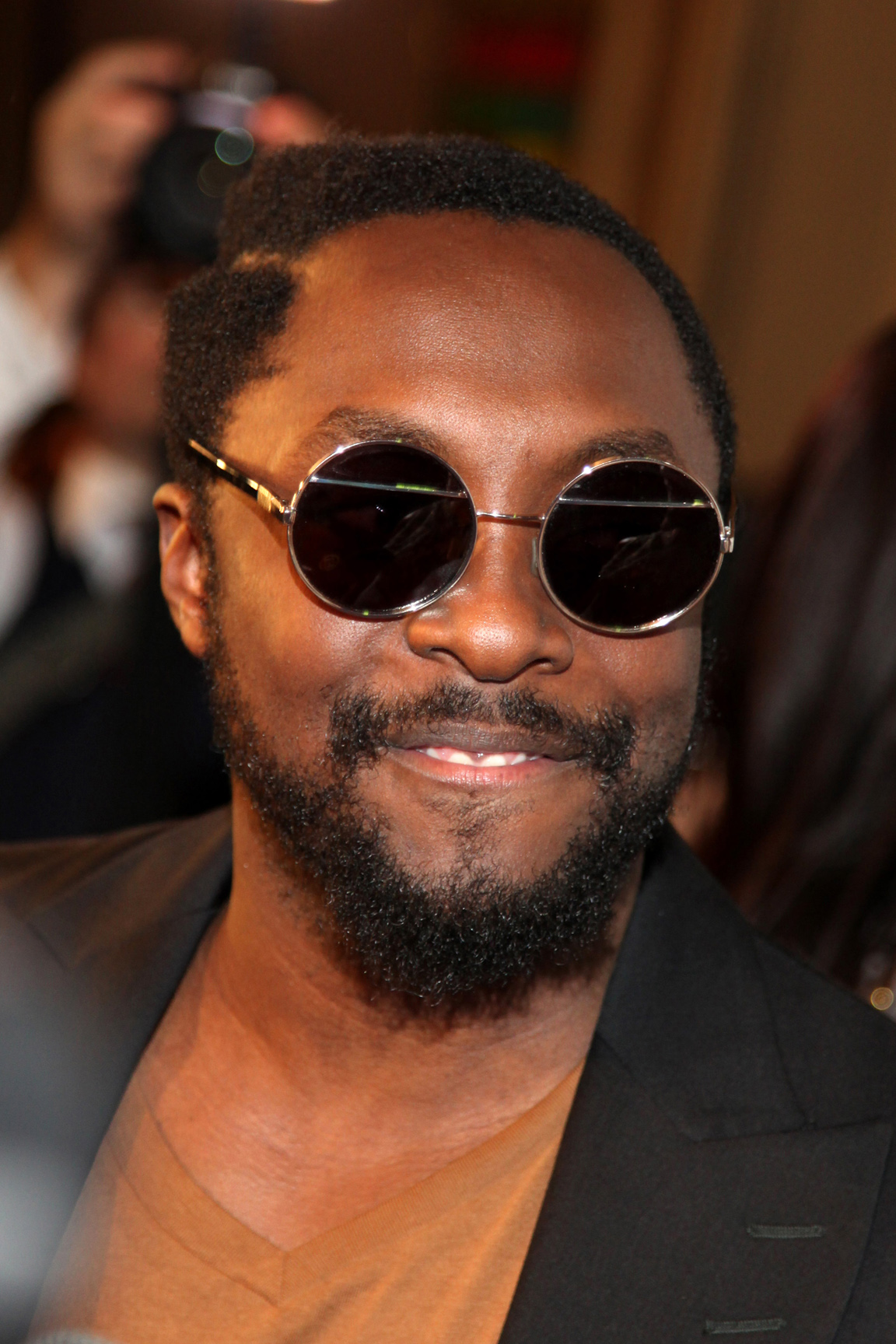
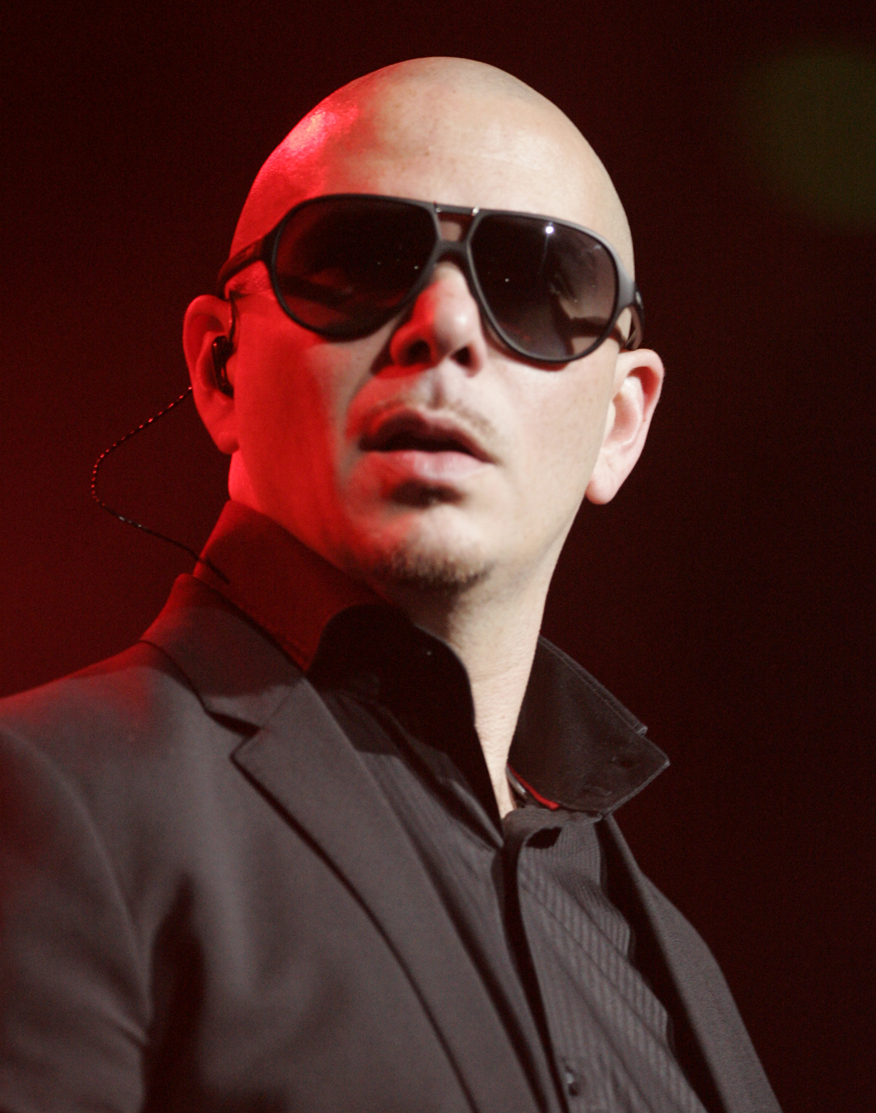
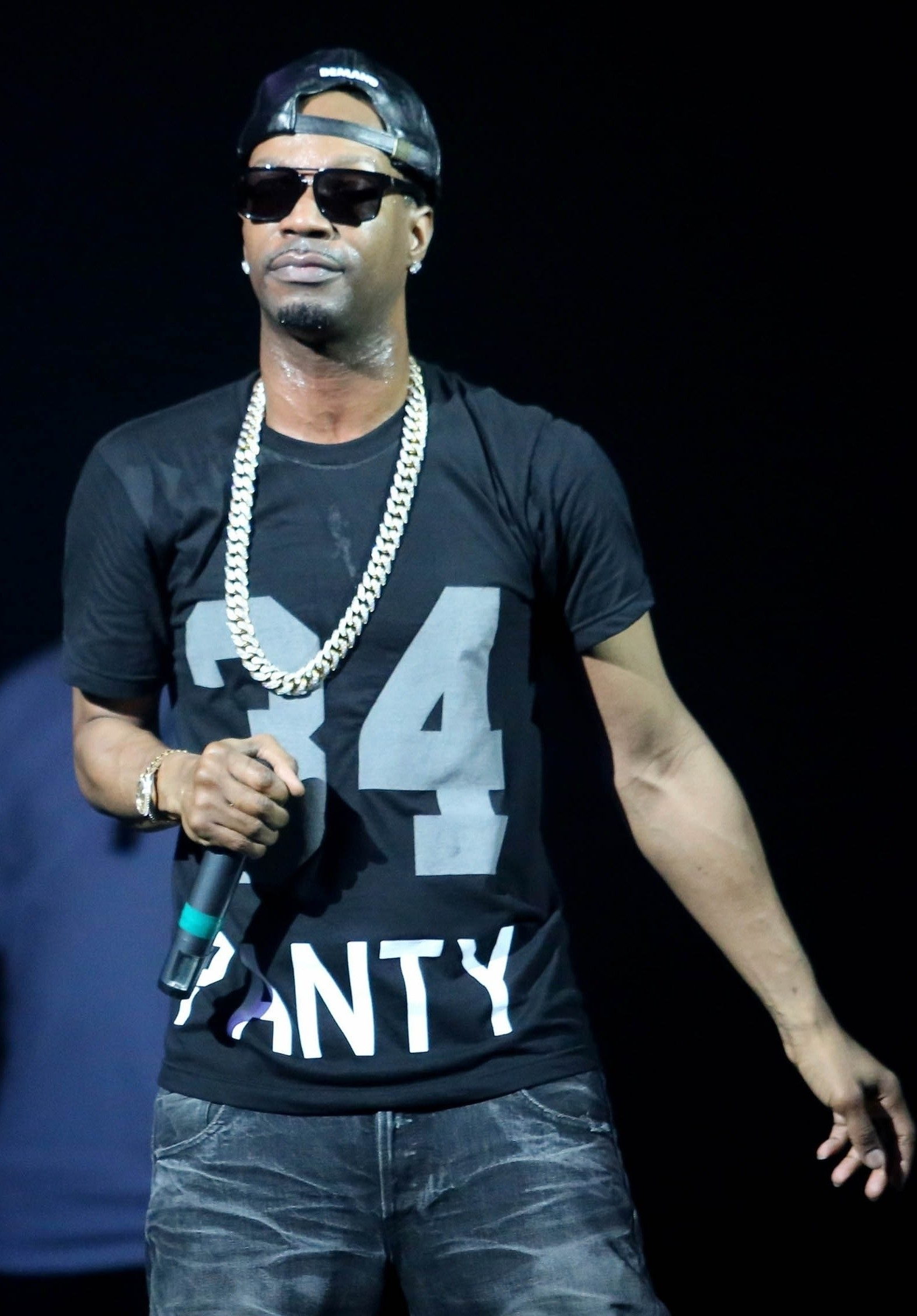
will.i.am, Pitbull, and Juicy J each contributed verses for three remixes.

The song was recorded for Kesha's second album, Warrior. Kesha stated that the track is this album's version of her 2010 single "We R Who We R". She recorded the song in June 2012.

will.i.am was in a nearby recording studio when he heard Luke, Blanco and Cirkut working with Kesha on the track, and immediately wanted to get involved. He co-wrote the album version and later wrote and recorded a new verse for himself, hoping he would be the featured artist in the song. Initially the record label decided not to include his verse; however, later his verse was included in the single/remix version of the song. It officially impacted contemporary hit radio on April 29, 2013, and rhythmic contemporary radio on May 7, 2013. It was made available for purchase as a digital download on April 30, 2013. will.i.am produced two other tracks whilst working with Luke, Blanco and Cirkut; they appear on will.i.am's album #willpower.

The second official remix, which features rapper Pitbull, follows the same formula as the will.i.am remix. As with the first remix, the song's second verse removed in favor of Pitbull's new verse and also includes Pitbull speaking during the intro. The third remix, featuring rapper Juicy J, was sent to U.S. Rhythmic radio and became available for purchase as a digital download on May 21, 2013. Rap-Up called the Juicy J remix "raucous".

== Composition ==
"Crazy Kids" combines the genres technopop, rap, and hip hop into what VIBE called "hip-pop". Lyrically, "Crazy Kids" was said to establish dualistic personalities for Kesha. The A.V. Club writer Annie Zaleski said: "On the acoustic guitar-driven choruses, she's sweet and melancholy as she reveals her insanity; on the electronic-dipped verses, she unloads snappy hip-hop boasts ("I'm no virgin or no Virgo / I'm crazy that's my word, though") to assert herself." Over hip hop dub beats, Kesha raps "coochie" with "Gucci", drops several f-bombs, and contributes her famous sing-rap style vocals in addition to traditional singing. The song prominently features whistling in several areas.

"Crazy Kids" is composed in the key of G minor at a tempo of 128 beats per minute.

== Music video ==
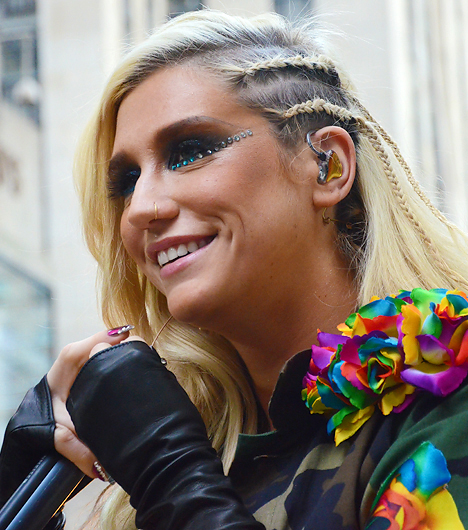
In the video, Kesha wore cornrows similar to the ones pictured. Critics congratulated the style-shift, comparing it to her hip hop peers, Riff Raff and Brooke Candy.

The official music video for "Crazy Kids" was filmed on May 9, 2013. The music video was released on May 28, 2013, and was uploaded in her YouTube Vevo account on May 29, 2013.

In the video Kesha wore large platform shoes and gold-rimmed sunglasses, as well as golden heart-shaped earrings. The video contains a scene where Kesha is flanked by chocolate-colored pit bulls, which Liza Darwin of MTV compared to the opening scene of the video for Lana Del Rey's song "Born to Die". In that video, Del Rey is situated between two Bengal tigers. Darwin also commented on Kesha's grill, comparing it to similar attire worn by Australian rapper Iggy Azalea.

== Critical reception ==
The song received mixed reviews from critics. The Huffington Post stated that: "in addition to sporting pastel cornrows, [Kesha] wore an outfit that could only be described as ...interesting... her light ink corset under a plaid shirt, [along with] denim hot [daisy dukes] paired with white thigh-high stockings evokes a Christina Aguilera in her 'Your Body'" video, meets James Franco in 'Spring Breakers' vibe". About the video, Kesha tweeted the following: "Just wait until you see what these super sweet biker dudes are doing in my video". PopCrush blogged about the video, saying: "clearly, Kesha, who is quite pretty, is going for the dork look, like Katy Perry did in her 'Last Friday Night (T.G.I.F.)' video. But instead of a headgear-and-braces-wearing nerd, she's more of a gangsta geek". Calling the video "an invitation to a lazy-Sunday house party", Canada's MuchMusic wrote that Kesha's "ghetto fabulous" hair and the Hells Angels bikers make the video complete, and that they "loved it". MTV called Kesha's look "eye-popping couture", suggesting the sunglasses as being inspired by Elton John and the braids by fellow rappers Riff Raff and Brooke Candy. Fashion writer Mickey Woods of Glamour affirmed the Brooke Candy comparison. Vulture documented a high volume of occult symbolism, specifically that which is conventionally associated with modern perceptions of the Bavarian Illuminati. Amanda Dobbins, the reviewer, toyed with the possibility of Kesha being a whistleblower for the cult, displaying the symbols such as the all-seeing eye tattooed on the rapper's palm, both overtly and excessively in the "Crazy Kids" video. Dobbins wrote: "She keeps waving it around, too, just to make sure that you see it and get mildly anxious about her Illuminati associations." Conversely, Dobbins suggested Kesha is serving consumers the Illuminati angle to snag more views, as Billboard and other mainstream music critics reported with the music video for "Die Young". MTV reported a similar position, noticing a trend with the singer and ocular-themed accessories, namely nail art. Paper blogger Abby Schreiber said: "Never one for subtlety, Ke$ha rocks...an Illuminati tattoo on her hand...."

During their critique of Warrior, Billboard said 'Crazy Kids' displayed Kesha at "her most take-it-or-leave it" and called the beats "grimy". Considering her vocals on "Crazy Kids" as some of the singer's best, Billboard called the chorus a "sing-a-long". Critics compared the track to "Like a G6" by the Far East Movement.

Critics unfavorably reviewed will.i.am's addition to the song. Spin's Mark Hogan said will.i.am's verse delivers "cheap crassness," but praised Kesha's solo version, stating that her "charisma is enough for you to keep from flipping the dial." Hogan also added that while "Crazy Kids" was inferior to will's Britney Spears' collaboration, "Scream & Shout", the song was destined for mainstream top 40 success.

The Honesty Hour ran an article stating that the original was "fine" without the additional verse, but that will.i.am can "only help the song" commercially.

== Commercial performance ==
"Crazy Kids" debuted on the Billboard Hot 100 at 59, and rose to a peak of 40, becoming her consecutive second solo single not to reach the top ten. It also peaked at 19 on the Mainstream Top 40 chart, also becoming her second solo single not to reach the top ten on those charts. On December 13, 2018, "Crazy Kids" received a platinum certification in the United States by the nation's Recording Industry Association of America (RIAA) for accomplishing combined sales and streaming equivalent units of 1 million in the country.

In the UK, "Crazy Kids" peaked at 27. In Australia the song peaked at 32 on the ARIA charts, obtaining a gold certification with digital sales of over 35,000 units.

== Credits and personnel ==
- Vocals – Kesha
- Guest vocals – Will.i.am, Juicy J
- Songwriting: Kesha, Lukasz Gottwald, William Adams, Jordan Houston, Henry Walter, Benjamin Levin
- Production: Dr. Luke, Cirkut, Benny Blanco

Credits adapted from the liner notes on BMI.

== Track listing ==
- Digital download (remix featuring will.i.am)
1. "Crazy Kids" (featuring will.i.am) – 3:49
- Digital download (remix featuring Juicy J)
1. "Crazy Kids" (featuring Juicy J) – 3:49
- Digital download (German extended play)
1. "Crazy Kids" (featuring will.i.am) – 3:49
2. "Crazy Kids" (featuring Juicy J) – 3:49
3. "Crazy Kids" – 3:50
4. "Crazy Kids" (instrumental) – 3:48
5. "Crazy Kids" (video) – 3:47

== Charts ==
=== Weekly charts ===
Weekly chart performance for "Crazy Kids"
| Chart (2013) | Peak position |
|---|---|
| Australia (ARIA) | 32 |
| Austria (Ö3 Austria Top 40) | 58 |
| Belgium (Ultratip Bubbling Under Flanders) | 5 |
| Belgium (Ultratip Bubbling Under Wallonia) | 8 |
| Canada Hot 100 (Billboard) | 47 |
| Canada CHR/Top 40 (Billboard) | 37 |
| Canada Hot AC (Billboard) | 37 |
| CIS Airplay (TopHit) | 162 |
| Germany (GfK) | 56 |
| Ireland (IRMA) | 14 |
| Italy Airplay (EarOne) | 79 |
| Lebanon (Lebanese Top 20) | 14 |
| Scottish Singles Sales (Official Charts) | 26 |
| Slovakia Airplay (ČNS IFPI) | 32 |
| South Korea (Circle) | 115 |
| South Korea Foreign (Circle) | 2 |
| UK Singles (Official Charts) | 27 |
| Ukraine Airplay (TopHit) | 39 |
| US Billboard Hot 100 | 40 |
| US Dance Club Songs (Billboard) | 32 |
| US Pop Airplay (Billboard) | 19 |

=== Year-end charts ===
2012 year-end chart performance for "Crazy Kids"
| Chart (2012) | Position |
|---|---|
| South Korea Foreign (Circle) original | 198 |

2013 year-end chart performance for "Crazy Kids"
| Chart (2013) | Position |
|---|---|
| South Korea Foreign (Circle) original | 134 |
| South Korea Foreign (Circle) remix featuring will.i.am | 82 |

== Certifications and sales ==
Certifications and sales for "Crazy Kids"
| Region | Certification | Certified units/sales |
|---|---|---|
| Australia (ARIA) | Platinum | 70,000^{‡} |
| South Korea (Gaon Chart) | — | 107,400 |
| United States (RIAA) | Platinum | 1,000,000^{‡} |
^{‡} Sales+streaming figures based on certification alone.

== Release history ==
Release dates for "Crazy Kids"
| Region | Date | Format | Version(s) | Label(s) | Ref. |
|---|---|---|---|---|---|
| United States | April 29, 2013 | Contemporary hit radio | Remix featuring will.i.am | RCA | |
| United States | April 30, 2013 | Digital download | Remix featuring will.i.am | Kemosabe; RCA | |
| United States | May 7, 2013 | Rhythmic contemporary radio | Remix featuring will.i.am | RCA | |
| Italy | May 10, 2013 | Radio airplay | Remix featuring will.i.am | Sony | |
| United States | May 21, 2013 | Digital download | Remix featuring Juicy J | Kemosabe | |
| United States | May 21, 2013 | Rhythmic contemporary radio | Remix featuring Juicy J | RCA | |
| Germany | June 14, 2013 | Digital download | Remix featuring will.i.am; remix featuring Juicy J; original; instrumental | Kemosabe | |
