= First and Last =

First and Last or The First and the Last or First & Last may refer to:

== Religion ==
- "the First and the Last", a title of God related to Alpha and Omega found in Revelation 22:13, capitalised in NKJV and some other versions.

== Books ==
- The First and the Last (play), a play by John Galsworthy
- The First and the Last, a memoir by Adolf Galland

== Music ==
- First and Last (album), an album by Glenn Spearman
- The First and the Last (album), a 1982 album by New Race
- Skynyrd's First and... Last, an album by Lynyrd Skynyrd
- First and Last and Always, an album by the Sisters of Mercy
- "First and Last Waltz", a song by Nickel Creek from Why Should the Fire Die?

== Film and TV ==
- First & Last, a 2020 British television game show presented by Jason Manford
- First and Last, a 1989 UK television movie starring Joss Ackland
- Ilk Ve Son Salih Bademci and Özge Özpirinçci 2021

== See also ==
- Alpha and Omega
- The Beginning and the End (disambiguation)
