= The Beginning of the End =

The Beginning of the End may refer to:

== Film and television ==
- Beginning of the End (film), a 1957 American science fiction film

=== Television episodes ===
- "Beginning of the End" (Agents of S.H.I.E.L.D.), 2014
- "Beginning of the End" (Orange Is the New Black), 2019
- "Beginning of the End" (Teenage Mutant Ninja Turtles 2003), 2006
- "The Beginning of the End" (30 Rock), 2012
- "The Beginning of the End" (Amphibia), 2022
- "The Beginning of the End" (Grimm), 2016
- "The Beginning of the End" (Lost), 2008
- "The Beginning of the End" (Merlin), 2008
- "The Beginning of the End" (My Little Pony: Friendship Is Magic), 2019
- "The Beginning of the End" (Ozark), 2022
- "The Beginning of the End" (Teenage Mutant Ninja Turtles 1987), 1996

== Literature ==
- "The Beginning of the End", a poem by Gerard Manley Hopkins
- "The Beginning of the End", one of three titles under which the Chinua Achebe story later known as "Marriage is a Private Affair" has been published.
- The Beginning of the End, a 1998 book by Angelo Quattrochi and Tom Nairn about the May 68 events in France

== Music ==
- The Beginning of the End (band), a Bahamian funk group

=== Albums ===
- The Beginning of the End (Sworn Enemy album) or the title song, 2006
- The Beginning of the End (UTP album), 2004
- The Beginning of the End, by Dreamcatcher, 2019
- Beginning of the End, an EP by Discharge, 2006

=== Songs ===
- "Beginning of the End" (Status Quo song), 2007
- "Beginning of the End", by Celldweller from Celldweller, 2000
- "Beginning of the End", by Into Eternity from Buried in Oblivion, 2004
- "Beginning of the End", by Judas Priest from Redeemer of Souls, 2014
- "Beginning of the End", by Spineshank from Self-Destructive Pattern, 2003
- "Beginning of the End", by Systematic from Somewhere in Between, 2001
- "Beginning of the End", by Santhosh Narayanan from Jigarthanda Indian film soundtrack, 2014
- "Beginning of the End", by Weezer from the Bill & Ted Face the Music film soundtrack, 2020
- "The Beginning of the End", by Boogiemonsters from God Sound, 1997
- "The Beginning of the End", by HIM from Greatest Lovesongs Vol. 666, 1997
- "The Beginning of the End", by Nine Inch Nails from Year Zero, 2007
- "The Beginning of the End", by Rob Zombie from Hellbilly Deluxe, 1998
- "The Beginning of the End", by Sabbat from Dreamweaver, 1989
- "The Beginning of the End", by Testament from Souls of Black, 1990

== See also ==
- The End of the Beginning (disambiguation)
- The Beginning or the End, a 1947 docudrama film
