= Die Young =

Single by Kesha

from the album Warrior
- Released: September 25, 2012
- Recorded: 2012
- Studio: Lotzah Matzah Studios (New York, New York); Luke's in the Boo (Malibu, California)
- Genre: Electro house; EDM
- Length: 3:32
- Label: RCA; Kemosabe
- Songwriters: Kesha Sebert; Lukasz Gottwald; Benjamin Levin; Nathaniel Ruess; Henry Walter
- Producers: Dr. Luke; Benny Blanco; Cirkut

Kesha singles chronology
"Blow" (2011)	"Die Young" (2012)	"C'Mon" (2012)

Juicy J singles chronology
"Bandz a Make Her Dance" (2012)	"Die Young" (remix) (2012)	"We Still in This Bitch" (2013)

Wiz Khalifa singles chronology
"Don't Make Em Like You" (2012)	"Die Young" (remix) (2012)	"Hate Bein' Sober" (2012)

Becky G singles chronology
"Oath" (2012)	"Die Young" (remix) (2012)	"Becky from the Block" (2013)

Music video
- "Die Young" on YouTube

Official lyric video
- "Die Young" on YouTube

"Die Young" is a song by American singer and songwriter Kesha. It was released on September 25, 2012, as the lead single from her second studio album, Warrior (2012). Kesha co-wrote the song with its producers, Dr. Luke, Benny Blanco, and Cirkut, with additional writing from Nate Ruess, the lead singer of Fun. Ruess wrote the words for the chorus, but Kesha wrote the lyrics after traveling around the world and embarking on a spiritual journey.

"Die Young" charted in multiple countries, debuting at 13 on the Billboard Hot 100 chart in the United States. In its third week, "Die Young" broke into the Hot 100's top-ten, making it Kesha's seventh consecutive top-ten hit as a lead artist since her debut on the chart in 2009 with "Tik Tok" and ninth top-ten hit overall including her collaborations with 3OH!3, Britney Spears, and Nicki Minaj. It eventually peaked at number two, continuing Kesha's string of top-ten singles. The song has also reached number one in Lebanon and the top ten in multiple additional countries worldwide, including most of the English-speaking world and has been certified 6× Platinum by the Recording Industry Association of America (RIAA) for selling six million equivalent units in the United States.

In December 2012, the song was removed from some radio stations in the wake of the Sandy Hook Elementary School shooting, rendering the title and chorus inappropriate for airplay.

== Background and composition ==
"Die Young"
Kesha sings over an acoustic guitar and synthesized beat during this sample of the song "Die Young".

Produced primarily by Dr. Luke and Benny Blanco, Kesha worked with the lead singer of fun., Nate Ruess, to write "Die Young". Co-producer Blanco called the song "old hippie rock". The song was written in 2011, after Kesha traveled the world. Before working on her second studio album, she went on a spiritual journey. Recalling experiences of feeding baby lions and swimming with great white sharks, Kesha said, "I got hypnotized, and I just really wanted this record to be really positive, really raw, really vulnerable and about the magic of life." She intends for the song to show her vulnerable side, saying, "I have a lot of growing and evolving to do. I'm definitely not a one-trick pony and I think people are starting to see that more and more."

About the song, she told Carson Daly on 97.1 AMP Radio:

"It's kind of an anthem. It's a celebration song, which I'm obviously known for writing those, but this one, the concept of it was to live each and every single day like it's your last and to always remain having a youthful spirit no matter how old I get...I can sing like a motherf***er! You're going to hear that because I'm also doing this acoustic EP for my fans. Some of the old songs and the new songs."

The song employs Kesha's trademark electropop sounds. "Die Young" spreads acoustic guitar strums, in the progression of C♯m-B-E-A in the key of C-sharp minor with a moderate tempo of 128 beats per minute, over an uptempo dance beat, while Kesha belts her half-rapped, half-sung vocals on the verses, where she says, "I hear your heart beat to the beat of the drums." Over throbbing percussion, she continues: "Oh what a shame that you came here with someone / So while you're here in my arms / Let's make the most of the night like we're gonna die young." "Die Young" features synth riffs in the new wave style, reminiscent of the Cars and other music in the 1980s. Towards the end of the song, a choir of backing vocals chimes the chorus over a glam rock drum beat.

== Critical reception ==
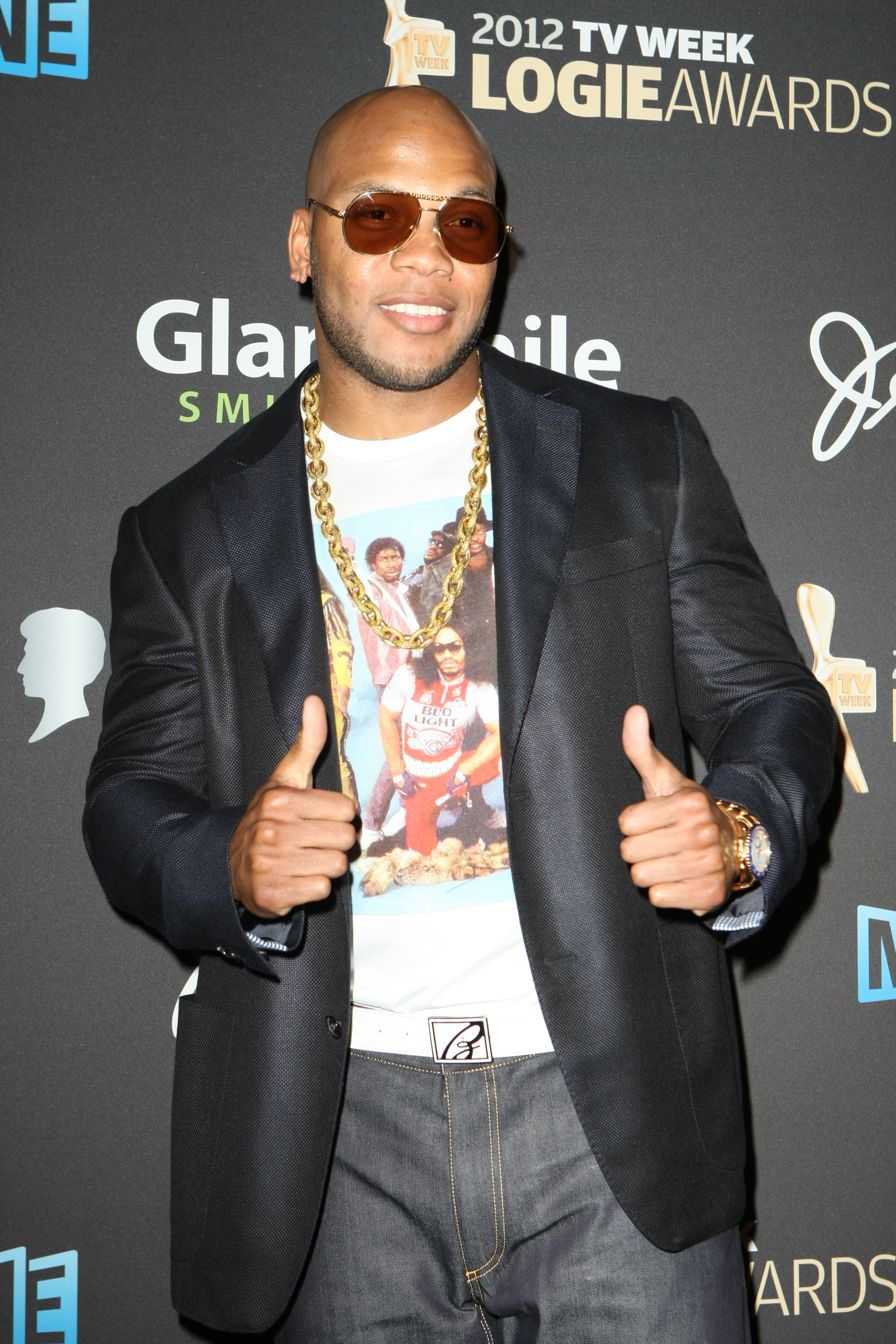
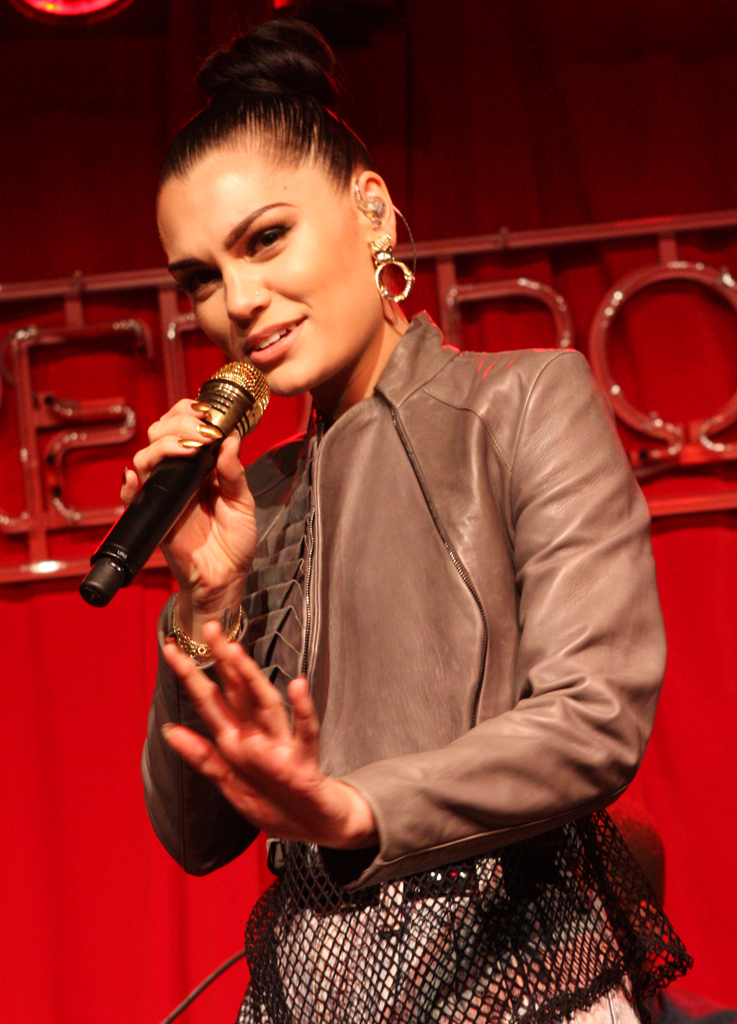
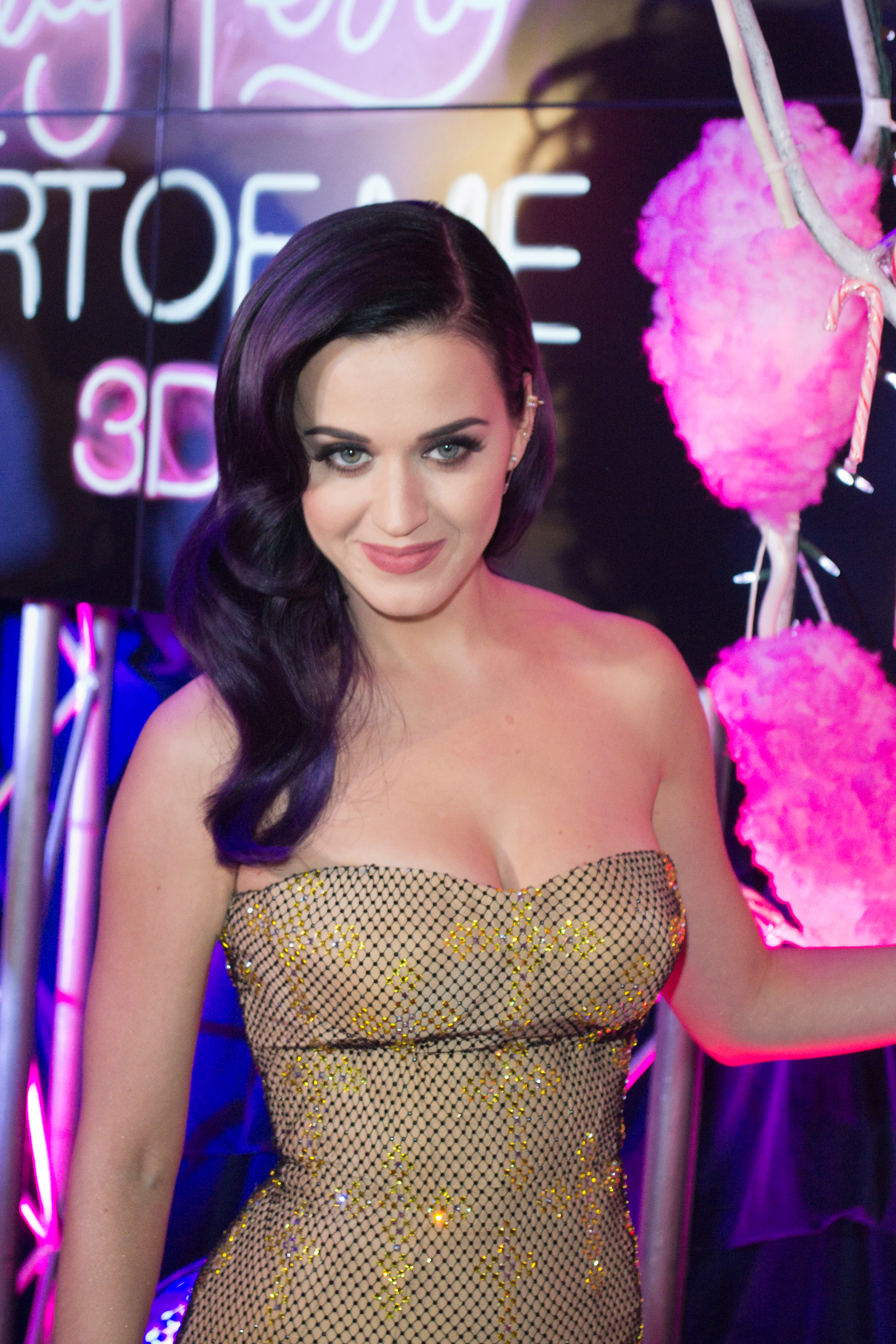
"Die Young" has been compared to "Good Feeling" by Flo Rida (left), "Domino" by Jessie J (middle) and "Teenage Dream" by Katy Perry (right) all of which were produced by Dr. Luke.

Seventeen called "Die Young" "classic Ke$ha", while Rolling Stone said it is "the Ke$ha we know and love," and that "it sounds sorta exactly like Taio Cruz". August Brown of the Los Angeles Times agreed, saying the single was, "...no major departure from her classic template of ravey pop spiced with gum-smacking raps and occasional vocal acrobatics." Further, she wrote that "Die Young" had a "stock-and-trade" message, with the title being, "...a fate... less like a thing to be avoided, and more like the goal is to live fast and leave a good-looking corpse." Marc Hogan of Spin wrote that Kesha's usual idiosyncrasies of punk rockers downing shots, transparent in even her worst songs, did not appear on "Die Young", announcing that "this one feels a bit more, well, blah than her previous hits." Perez Hilton posted the song to his blog with the title "Ke$ha's New Single Die Young Is A Killer!", and said, "...[it] has us getting up and dancing like there's no tomorrow." Contactmusic.com noted the song's success on Twitter, where fans tweeted their appreciation. The reviewer also acknowledged Hogan's negative review, saying that a few more plays would convert him to the song. Indie music blog Stereogum said the song was "glorious", "establishing Ke$ha as one of the industry's best new pop songwriters". Sarah Polosky of Vibe said the song's production worked like water, with the message being steadfast, and the beats dangerously addictive. On the lyrics video, she noted similarities between K-pop singer, PSY's 2012 hit, "Gangnam Style". The song's major similarity to Flo Rida's "Good Feeling" has been acknowledged by Billboard. The song has also been compared to "Domino" by Jessie J and "Teenage Dream" by Katy Perry. All three songs have also been produced by Dr. Luke. Conversely, Jessica Sager of Pop Crush made the same comparisons, and also praised the lack of Auto-Tune in "Die Young". Another source to acknowledge the similarities is MTV saying, "So do we think "Die Young" is pushing [Kesha] toward new sonic heights? Not particularly." Entertainment Weekly critic Ray Rahmen lent "Die Young" a positive review, saying it had all "the pop swag of a high-school girl sneaking a bottle of Smirnoff Ice into prom," before praising the song's remix potential. Bill Lamb of About.com was very positive of the song, giving it five out of five stars and claiming the song "defines the moment in pop music" and calling it "flawless".

The song later placed at number 22 on The Village Voice's 40th annual Pazz & Jop critics' poll.

== Commercial performance ==
On October 1, 2012, "Die Young" debuted on the Billboard Mainstream Top 40 chart at number 21, marking Kesha's highest ranking debut on that chart. "Die Young" entered the US Billboard Hot 100 at number 13, also debuting at number three on the Digital Songs chart with 188,000 digital downloads sold within its first week. On the Radio Songs chart, the song garnered 31 million in radio audience. On the week ending in October 27, "Die Young" debuted on Billboard's Dance Club Songs chart at number 45. In its third week, "Die Young" rose to number eight on the Hot 100, earning Kesha her eighth consecutive top-ten hit on the chart since her debut with "Tik Tok" in 2010. In its fifth week, the song jumped to number four on the chart. For the week ending December 8, 2012, "Die Young" reached its eventual peak of number two, being kept off the top spot by Rihanna's "Diamonds". On track to become her third number one in the country, the single began to lose airplay in December 2012, when several radio stations petitioned to stop playing the song due to the Sandy Hook Elementary School shooting. As a result, the track subsequently began falling down the charts. Despite this, "Die Young" became a number one hit on the Mainstream Top 40 chart, earning Kesha her third chart-topper alongside "Your Love Is My Drug" and "Tik Tok", and her sixth top ten hit for that chart as well. As of 2016, "Die Young" has sold 2.9 million digital downloads in the United States. Furthermore, "Die Young" has since been certified 6× Platinum in the United States as of September 2024 by the nation's Recording Industry Association of America (RIAA), for sales and streaming equivalent-units in excess of 6 million in the country.

In Canada, "Die Young" debuted on the Canadian Hot 100 at number 10 on the week of October 13, 2012, eventually peaking at number 4 on its fifth week on the chart, earning Kesha her eighth top ten hit in the country. In the United Kingdom, "Die Young" debuted on the UK Official Singles chart at number 10, on the date issued December 2, 2012. The following week it rose to number seven, becoming her third solo top ten hit and fifth top ten hit overall in the nation. In Australia and New Zealand, the single peaked within the top ten in both territories, at numbers three and nine respectively.

== Removal from radio stations ==
"Ultimately, 'Die Young' has, content-wise, nothing to do with what happened... But a lot of us went, 'That doesn't feel right, to be even saying the words 'Die Young' right now on the radio.'"

— Steve Jones, vice president of programming for Canadian radio station chain Newcap Radio, on the company's decision to pull the song

On December 15, 2012, the day after the Sandy Hook Elementary School shooting occurred, "Die Young" was withdrawn from various radio stations across the United States, causing "Not Your Fault Kesha" to trend on Twitter. The withdrawal was met with a mixed response online. In response, Kesha tweeted: "I'm so so so sorry for anyone who has been affected by this tragedy and I understand why my song is now inappropriate. Words cannot express." In a separate tweet, Kesha confessed that she had no control over the lyrical content of the song and was forced to sing it. Despite being credited as a songwriter on the track, she did not contribute to the chorus lyrically, as this part was written by Nate Ruess, although she reaffirmed that she fully resonated with the song's message; the tweet verifying this was later deleted. Prior to the event, the song had reached a peak position of number two on the Billboard Hot 100, but dropped as a result of losing airplay following the incident, from 167 million impressions at its peak on radio to 148 million, a decline of 19 million total radio impressions. A music source told TMZ that such a drastic airplay drop is rare, that the last of such magnitude being seen was following the Dixie Chicks' criticism of former US president George W. Bush. According to Billboard, other songs that saw decreased airplay in the wake of the shooting and got removed from some radio stations included Foster the People's "Pumped Up Kicks" and David Guetta's "Titanium".

In 2024, Kesha revealed in an interview with Vulture that she had an issue with the title of the song and originally wanted to name it "Beating My Drum", but did not have the control to change it. She also went on to describe having the song be in the same conversation and timing as the shooting as "fucking painful".

== Music video ==
=== Background and release ===
The video was directed by Chris Applebaum and Darren Craig but Applebaum withdrew his name from the official credits. To promote the single, two teaser trailers were released online. The first showed a waffle waitress holding a slip of paper inscribed with a capital "R", which resembles the official logo of Rihanna, leading to rumors that Rihanna would possibly be featured on the song. The second video appeared online, after the singer tweeted, "Wanna hint?". It displayed Kesha in the Tokyo Metro, whistling the chorus of "Die Young" An official lyric video was posted to Kesha's Vevo account the day of the single's release. On September 24, 2012, celebrity makeup artist and blogger for People Scott Barnes wrote that he was working with Kesha on the music video for "Die Young". On the video itself and the makeup artistry behind it, he said:

"... I like to blow people’s expectations away, and that means creating something they’ve never seen before — so stay tuned to see what we come up with."

Photographs of Kesha on-set for the filming of the music video leaked online. Jenna Hally Rubenstein of MTV commented: "...Kesha [is] into wearing basically nothing these days...and it's looking like that no-clothes theme has continued." She compared the leaked photographs and the cover art for the single, further comparing it to Cher's body rope, certain professional wrestlers, and Amazon princesses. Kesha announced that the video would be released the following day on November 7.

=== Concept and synopsis ===
Playing the role of a cult leader, Kesha and her fictitious disciples raid a hamlet in rural Mexico, engaging in various forms of sexual debauchery. According to Billboard, the video is a shout-out to the Illuminati. Occult symbols ubiquitously associated with the secret society such as the all-seeing eye of Horus, inverted crosses, pentagrams, and triangles pervade the video. Calling the imagery "blatant", Billboard reviewed the video as "tak[ing] the singer's button-pushing ability to dizzying new heights." Sending text messages to her Animals (an affection name bestowed on her fans) in the video, Kesha writes: "We made it… SOUTH OF THE BORDER… they'll never find us here".

== Live performances ==
Kesha has declared that it is important for her, with Warrior and her live performances of "Die Young", to display her vocal ability due to the backlash she has received about using excessive auto-tune. Kesha first performed "Die Young" on October 29, 2012, in El Rey Theatre. Emily Zemler of The Hollywood Reporter reviewed the performance, blogging: "If pop music demands an element of theatrical presentation, then Ke$ha angled toward a literal interpretation of her raucous, sexualized pop songs". DJed by Herick Hell, Kesha performed various other songs including "Party at a Rich Dude's House", "Cannibal", and "We R Who We R". Clad in a rhinestone one-piece, Kesha wore a gold diadem while being carried by muscular cabana boy look-a-likes. The set was rife with green laser beams and giant artificial phalli. On November 6, 2012, Kesha made the song's first televised performance in the fourth season of Australian The X Factor. On November 20, 2012, Kesha performed "Die Young" on Today in New York, NY. The performance was held in the Rockefeller Plaza, and she wore a camouflage leotard adorned with an upside cross and rainbow-colored paper flowers. Along with "Die Young", she performed her other smash hits, "Blow" and "We R Who We R". Billboard congratulated "Die Young"'s performance at the American Music Awards of 2012 as being one of the five best performances that night. On December 4, 2012, Kesha performed "Die Young" at the late-night show Conan. For the music journal, Jason Lipshutz wrote:

"Ke$ha's performance of new single "Die Young" was resoundingly Ke$ha-esque: there were flashing neon lasers, skeleton drummer-dancers, an inexplicable headdress at the beginning and a totally explicable crotch-grab in the middle. With blonde pigtails running across her shoulders and black leather boots hiked up to her knees, Ke$ha was often carried on the shoulders of shirtless men with a look of unabashed joy on her face – a fitting image for a single about shirking tomorrow's responsibilities for carnal impulses."

== In popular culture ==
The song was featured in the film Neighbors, appearing in the film's soundtrack. The song was also featured in the season 2 finale of the adult animated comedy series, Solar Opposites. It was also featured in several editions of the Just Dance video game series by Ubisoft, including Just Dance 4, Just Dance 2014, and Just Dance 2015. Independent animator Vivienne Medrano, later creating Hazbin Hotel and Helluva Boss, would make a fan animation for the song, posting it on her YouTube channel. By November 2019, the animation would have over 50 million views. On June 24, 2023, Kesha guest-starred in the Helluva Boss season one finale "Queen Bee", as Queen Bee-lzebub, a character physically designed after the focal character of Medrano's music video that had used her voice.

In 2021, the song became part of a popular TikTok trend in which a person plays the song over a speaker outside of another person's closed door, and the first person bangs on the door to the signature drum beats in the chorus, then flees before the other person can answer the door. Several college campuses have banned this activity due to noise complaints, and police have been called in residential neighborhoods with residents claiming either property damage or assuming a home invasion is happening.

== Parodies ==
In November 2012, the song was for example parodied by the YouTube channel The Key of Awesome. The parody mentions the similarity to "Good Feeling" by Flo Rida.

Later in the same month, the song was also parodied by the Filipino radio station 93.9 iFM with the title "Amalayer" named after a viral video incident in a station of the Manila LRT System.

== Formats and track listings ==
Digital download

1. "Die Young" – 3:33

Digital download (Deconstructed mix)

1. "Die Young" (Deconstructed mix) – 3:21

Digital download (remix)

1. "Die Young" (remix; featuring Juicy J, Wiz Khalifa and Becky G) – 4:02

German CD and UK digital download

1. "Die Young" – 3:33
2. "Die Young" (instrumental) – 3:33

Digital download (EP)

1. "Die Young" – 3:33
2. "Die Young" (remix; featuring Juicy J, Wiz Khalifa and Becky G) – 4:02
3. "Die Young" (Dallas K extended mix) – 5:49
4. "Die Young" (Dallas K radio edit) – 3:38

Digital download (IC & Nordh extended remix)

1. "You're Gonna Die Young" (IC & Nordh extended remix; featuring Nervo) – 6:22

== Credits and personnel ==
- Songwriting – Kesha Sebert, Nate Ruess, Lukasz Gottwald, Henry Walter, Benjamin Levin,
- Production, instruments, and programming – Dr. Luke, Benny Blanco, Cirkut

Credits adapted from the liner notes on BMI.

== Charts ==
=== Weekly charts ===
Weekly chart performance for "Die Young"
Chart (2012–2013)	Peak position
Australia (ARIA)	3
Australia (ARIA Dance)	1
Austria (Ö3 Austria Top 40)	4
Belgium (Ultratop 50 Flanders)	19
Belgium (Ultratop 50 Wallonia)	13
Canada Hot 100 (Billboard)	4
Canada AC (Billboard)	41
Canada CHR/Top 40 (Billboard)	2
Canada Hot AC (Billboard)	3
CIS Airplay (TopHit)	13
Czech Republic Airplay (ČNS IFPI)	25
Denmark (Tracklisten)	27
Europe (Billboard Euro Digital Songs)	7
Finland (Suomen virallinen lista)	19
France (SNEP)	12
Germany (GfK)	20
Global Dance Songs (Billboard)	5
Honduras (Honduras Top 50)	32
Hungary (Rádiós Top 40)	9
Ireland (IRMA)	14
Italy Airplay (EarOne)	7
Italy (FIMI)	10
Japan Hot 100 (Billboard)	3
Japan Adult Contemporary (Billboard)	1
Latvia (European Hit Radio)	17
Lebanon (Lebanese Top 20)	1
Lithuania (European Hit Radio)	10
Mexico Airplay (Billboard)	17
Mexico Anglo (Monitor Latino)	10
Mexico Ingles Airplay (Billboard)	2
Netherlands (Dutch Tipparade 40)	4
Netherlands (Single Top 100)	56
New Zealand (Recorded Music NZ)	9
Norway (VG-lista)	8
Perú (UNIMPRO)	5
Poland (Video Chart)	5
Romania TV Airplay (Media Forest)	8
Russia Airplay (TopHit)	13
Scottish Singles Sales (Official Charts)	3
Slovakia Airplay (ČNS IFPI)	20
South Korea (Circle)	56
South Korea Foreign (Circle)	2
Spain (Promusicae)	34
Sweden (Sverigetopplistan)	14
Switzerland (Schweizer Hitparade)	23
Turkey (Number One Top 20)	10
UK Singles (Official Charts)	7
Ukraine Airplay (TopHit)	35
US Billboard Hot 100	2
US Adult Pop Airplay (Billboard)	14
US Dance Club Songs (Billboard)	8
US Dance Airplay (Billboard)	4
US Latin Pop Airplay (Billboard)	20
US Pop Airplay (Billboard)	1
US Rhythmic Airplay (Billboard)	10

=== Year-end charts ===
Year-end chart performance for "Die Young"
Chart (2012)	Position
Australia (ARIA)	43
Australia (ARIA Dance)	5
Canada Hot 100 (Billboard)	93
CIS (TopHit)	177
France (SNEP)	162
South Korea Foreign (Circle)	49
UK Singles (Official Charts)	134
US Billboard Hot 100	85

Chart (2013)	Position
Australia (ARIA Dance)	46
Canada Hot 100 (Billboard)	55
CIS (TopHit)	158
France (SNEP)	169
Hungary (Rádiós Top 100)	80
Italy Airplay (EarOne)	66
Italy (FIMI)	65
Japan Hot 100 (Billboard)	68
Japan Adult Contemporary (Billboard)	20
Japan Hot Overseas (Billboard)	17
Sweden (Sverigetopplistan)	94
UK Singles (Official Charts)	119
Ukraine Airplay (TopHit)	176
US Billboard Hot 100	57
US Dance/Mix Show Airplay (Billboard)	43
US Pop Airplay (Billboard)	38
US Radio Songs (Billboard)	41

== Certifications and sales ==
Certifications and sales for "Die Young"
Region	Certification	Certified units/sales
Australia (ARIA)	5× Platinum	350,000^{‡}
Canada (Music Canada)	Platinum	80,000^{*}
Germany (BVMI)	Gold	150,000^{^}
Italy (FIMI)	Platinum	30,000^{*}
Mexico (AMPROFON)	Platinum	60,000^{*}
New Zealand (RMNZ)	3× Platinum	90,000^{‡}
South Korea (Circle)	—	240,300
Spain (Promusicae)	Gold	30,000^{‡}
Sweden (GLF)	Platinum	40,000^{‡}
United Kingdom (BPI)	2× Platinum	1,200,000^{‡}
United States (RIAA)	6× Platinum	6,000,000^{‡}
Streaming
Denmark (IFPI Danmark)	2× Platinum	3,600,000^{†}
^{*} Sales figures based on certification alone.^{^} Shipments figures based on certification alone.^{‡} Sales+streaming figures based on certification alone.^{†} Streaming-only figures based on certification alone.

== Release history ==
Release dates and formats for "Die Young"
Region	Date	Format(s)	Version(s)	Ref.
United States	September 25, 2012	Digital download	Original	
Australia	September 26, 2012	Digital download	Original	
New Zealand	September 26, 2012	Digital download	Original	
United States	October 2, 2012	Contemporary hit radio; rhythmic contemporary radio	Original	
Italy	October 5, 2012	Radio airplay	Original	
Europe	November 18, 2012	Digital download	Original	
Various	November 23, 2012	Digital download	Deconstructed mix	
Various	November 23, 2012	Digital download	Remix	
Germany	November 23, 2012	CD	Original; instrumental	
United Kingdom	November 25, 2012	Digital download	Original; instrumental	
Italy	November 30, 2012	Radio airplay	Remix	
Various	September 11, 2015	Digital download	IC & Nordh extended remix	

== See also ==
- List of Billboard Hot 100 top-ten singles in 2012
- List of UK top-ten singles in 2012
- List of top 10 singles for 2012 in Australia
