= Kesha: My Crazy Beautiful Life =

- Genre: Reality television
- Starring: Kesha
- Country of origin: United States
- Original language: English
- No. of seasons: 2
- No. of episodes: 14

Production
- Executive producers: Jack Rovner; Jacquelyn French; Ken Levitan; Lagan Sebert; Liz Gateley; Lukasz Gottwald; Tony DiSanto
- Running time: 21–24 minutes
- Production companies: DiGa Vision; Kemosabe Entertainment; Magic Seed Productions; Vector Management

Original release
- Network: MTV
- Release: April 23 – December 18, 2013

Kesha: My Crazy Beautiful Life is an American documentary television series about the life of singer Kesha. It aired on MTV for two seasons from April 23 until its cancellation on December 18, 2013.

== Premise ==
The first season of Ke$ha: My Crazy Beautiful Life chronicles Kesha as she works through all the drama and adventures in both her personal and professional life over the course of two years, during her Get Sleazy Tour. Filmed by her brother Lagan Sebert and filmmaker Steven Greenstreet, it also encompasses the artist as she creates her second studio album, Warrior, and travels to various countries. Season 2 focuses primarily on Kesha's personal life, family dynamics and her trying to live a normal life during a much needed break from touring.

== Cast ==
=== Main cast ===
- Kesha Sebert
- Pebe Sebert, Kesha's, Lagan's and Louie's mother
- Lagan Sebert, Kesha's older brother
- Louie Sebert, Kesha's younger brother

=== Supporting cast ===
- Max Bernstein
- Monica Cornia, Kesha's manager
- Rio Sebert, Kesha's three-year-old nephew and Lagan's son.
- Elias Mallin, Kesha's drummer
- Savannah, Kesha's best friend
- Tessa, Kesha's personal assistant
- Kalan, Kesha's cousin
- Nicole, Kesha's best friend and former assistant
- Sean, Kalan's fiancé
- Erica, Kesha's current assistant
- Steven Tyler

== Episodes ==
=== Series overview ===
Season	Episodes	Originally released	
Season	Episodes	First released	Last released
1	6	April 23, 2013	May 28, 2013
2	8	October 30, 2013	December 18, 2013

=== Season 1 (2013) ===
No. overall	No. in season	Title	Original release date
1	1	"Taking the Stage"	April 23, 2013
With the start of her headlining tour, Kesha faces memories of a failed first love, and becomes a voice for people that have been bullied.
2	2	"Animal on the Hunt"	April 30, 2013
Despite many bumps in the road, Kesha stays determined to reach her dream of performing at Glastonbury, and accomplish her goal of finding the perfect man.
3	3	"Haters Gonna Hate"	May 7, 2013
After a mistake in her show leads to strong criticism, Kesha has to step up her game to ensure that her next show is a critical success.
4	4	"The End Is the Beginning"	May 14, 2013
As the tour comes to an end, Kesha plans to go on vacation and find inspiration for her next album, but these plans are put on hold for the biggest show of her career.
5	5	"A Warrior In the Making"	May 21, 2013
Kesha faces the challenge of making her second album and struggles to find balance between creating a new sound and remaining true to her pop roots.
6	6	"Ringing In the New"	May 28, 2013
After her album's release, Kesha kicks off a promotional tour, but faces many setbacks when a scandalous picture is leaked and one of her songs is pulled from the radio.

=== Season 2 (2013) ===
No. overall	No. in season	Title	Original release date
7	1	"Supernatural"	October 30, 2013
Kesha promotes her second album Warrior on her biggest tour yet, during which she faces haunted hotels, ghosts, and fears of performing her song "Supernatural" for the very first time.
8	2	"Assistant"	November 6, 2013
The Westboro Baptist Church protests one of Kesha's shows, and Kesha looks for a new assistant who can handle her crazy lifestyle and family.
9	3	"Bahamas"	November 13, 2013
Kesha takes her best friend Savannah on a much needed vacation to the Bahamas, with a few surprises up her sleeve. Back home, a pet psychic tends to their cranky cat, Mr. Peeps.
10	4	"Proposal"	November 20, 2013
Despite dealing with the pain of a bad break-up, Kesha goes all out to help her cousin's boyfriend plan the ultimate marriage proposal in Las Vegas.
11	5	"Matchmaker"	November 27, 2013
Kesha shops for a new and more sensible car. A matchmaker finds a man for Kesha's mother Pebe, and sets Kesha up on a blind date as well.
12	6	"Hoarding"	December 4, 2013
Kesha deals with her mother's hoarding habits and meets distant relatives in Hungary.
13	7	"Bear Man"	December 11, 2013
Kesha travels to the Alaskan wilderness to see if there is still a romantic spark between her and a rocky old flame, "Bear Man".
14	8	"Meet the Family"	December 18, 2013
Kesha finally invites Bear Man to meet her family, and the fate of their relationship is shown as season 2 concludes.

== Reception ==
The first season received mixed to positive reviews from critics. Metacritic, which gives reviews on a scale of one to 100, gave the show's first season a 55, which represents mixed or average reviews.

== Controversy ==
The episode "A Warrior in the Making", which aired on May 21, 2013, was subject to criticism from the Parents Television Council due to a short scene in which Kesha supposedly tastes her own urine.
