= The Midnight Beast discography =

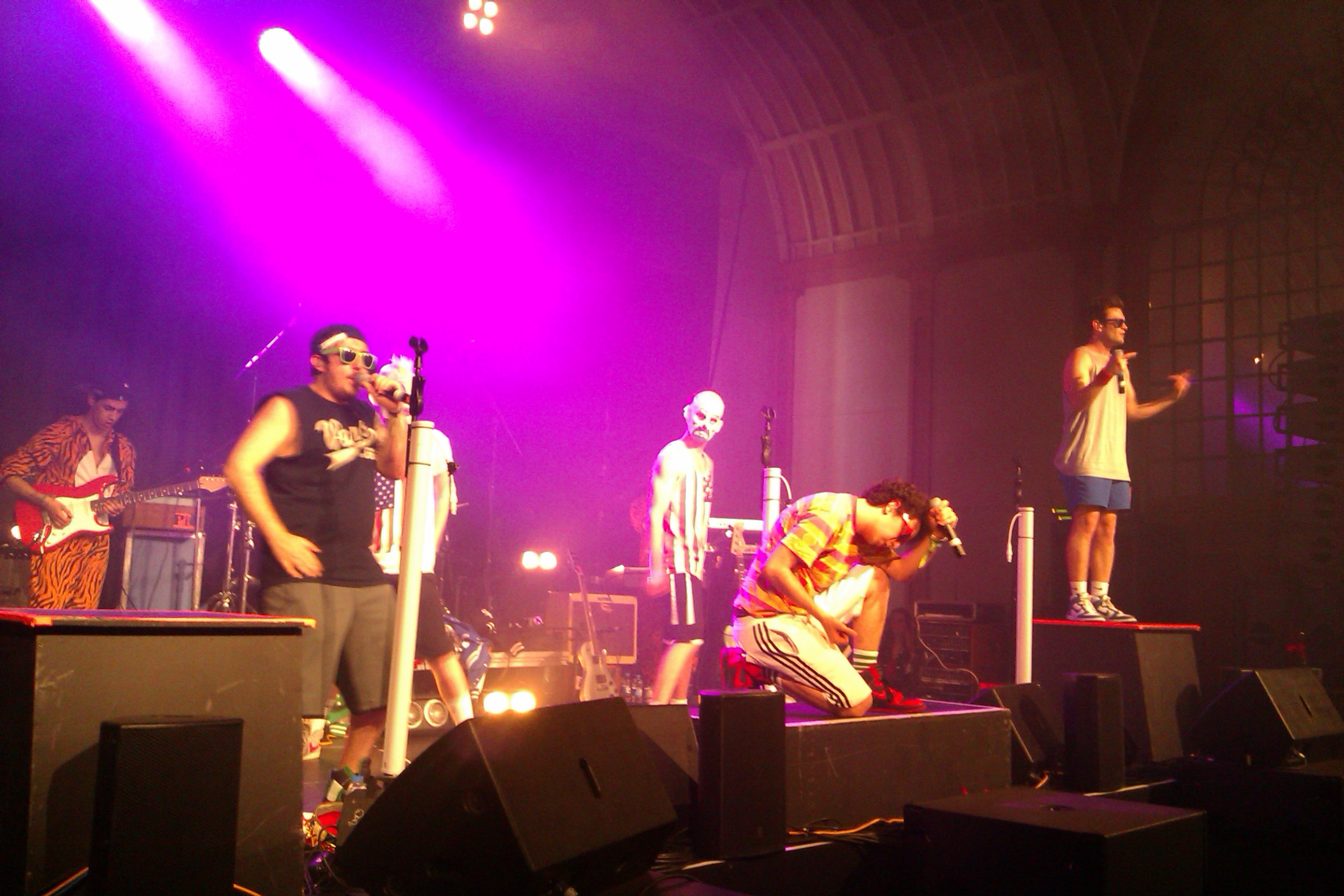
- The Midnight Beast performing in Brighton, 2013
- Studio albums: 3
- EPs: 4
- Soundtrack albums: 1
- Singles: 31
- TV series: 2

The discography of English comedy band The Midnight Beast consists of three studio albums, three EPs, and thirty-one singles.

In 2012, following the release of the first season of their self-titled television series, the band released their debut self-titled album on their own label, Sounds Like Good. The album consisted of 13 tracks from the television series, as well as two bonus tracks. On the CD release of the album, the bonus track "Nerds" replaced the bonus track "Too Many Drunk Girls". The album peaked at number 10 on the UK Indie Albums chart.

Following the finale of season two of their series, the band released their second album Shtick Heads in June 2016. The album peaked at number 74 on the UK Albums Top 100 chart.

In 2018, the band released a new 'Claws' logo, that would serve as the artwork for their third album, The Album Nobody Asked For. which was released on 24 August 2018, and the artwork for the album's five singles.

== Studio albums ==
Year	Album details	Peak chart positions
Year	Album details	UK
2012	The Midnight Beast: Released: 13 August 2012; Label: Sounds Like Good; Formats: CD, digital download	24
2014	Shtick Heads: Released: 2 June 2014; Label: Sounds Like Good; Formats: CD, digital download	74
2018	The Album Nobody Asked For.: Released: 24 August 2018; Label: Sounds Like Good; Formats: CD, digital download	—
"—" denotes a release that did not chart or was not released in that country

== Soundtracks ==
Year	Title
2016	All Killer: Released: 23 August 2016; Label: Sounds Like Good; Formats: Digital download

== EPs ==
Year	Title	Label	Chart positions
Year	Title	Label	UK
2010	Booty Call EP	Midnight Beast Records; AWAL	64
2013	Love Bites EP	Sounds Like Good	—
2014	The Unholy Trinity	Sounds Like Good	—
2015	Self-Depreciation Nation	Sounds Like Good	—
"—" denotes a release that did not chart or was not released in that country

== Singles ==
Year	Title	Peak chart positions			Album
Year	Title	UK	AUS	IRE	Album
2009	"Tik Tok (Parody)"	90	4	39	Non-album single
2010	"Ninjas"	—	—	—	The Midnight Beast
2010	"Lez Be Friends"	—	—	—	The Midnight Beast
2010	"House Party"	—	—	—	Non-album single
2010	"Just Another Boyband"	—	—	—	The Midnight Beast
2011	"The Dance Routine"	140	—	—	Non-album singles
2011	"Pizza in Ibiza"	—	—	—	Non-album singles
2012	"I'm So Manly (I Make Men Cry)"	—	—	—	Non-album singles
2012	"Return of the Boyband"	—	—	—	Non-album singles
2012	"Die Young (Parody)"	—	—	—	Non-album singles
2013	"Bass Face"	—	—	—	Shtick Heads
2014	"Ubercvrrnt" (featuring The Hell)	—	—	—	Shtick Heads
2014	"The Unholy Trinity"	—	—	—	Non-album singles
2014	"#Selfie (Parody)"	—	—	—	Non-album singles
2014	"You & I (Parody)"	—	—	—	Non-album singles
2014	"After the After, After Party (Original Motion Picture Soundtrack)"	—	—	—	Non-album singles
2014	"Wiggle (Video Audio)"	—	—	—	Non-album singles
2014	"We Won't Remember Christmas" (featuring Brett Domino)	—	—	—	Non-album singles
2015	"Better Than Sex"	—	—	—	Self-Deprecation Nation
2015	"The Rejected Bond Song"	—	—	—	Non-album singles
2016	"Going 2 Miami"	—	—	—	Non-album singles
2016	"Turn It Up"	—	—	—	The Album Nobody Asked For.
2016	"Gettin' High"	—	—	—	Non-album singles
2016	"M.I.L.F $ (Parody)"	—	—	—	Non-album singles
2016	"Pokémon (Parody)"	—	—	—	Non-album singles
2017	"Kiss Your Sister"	—	—	—	Non-album singles
2018	"Send Nudes"	—	—	—	The Album Nobody Asked For.
2018	"Clickbait" (featuring Daz Black & Soheila)	—	—	—	The Album Nobody Asked For.
2018	"Butt Dial"	—	—	—	The Album Nobody Asked For.
2018	"Last One at the Party"	—	—	—	The Album Nobody Asked For.
2018	"Badass"	—	—	—	The Album Nobody Asked For.
"—" denotes a release that did not chart or was not released in that country

== Releases from The Midnight Beast sitcom ==
Title	Year	Peak chart positions	Episode	Label	Release Date
Title	Year	UK Indie	Episode	Label	Release Date
"I Kicked a Shark in the Face"	2012	6	Episode 1	Sounds Like Good	5 July 2012
"Begging"	2012	2	Episode 1	Sounds Like Good	5 July 2012
"Ninjas"	2012	—	Episode 1	Sounds Like Good	5 July 2012
"Medium Pimpin'"	2012	20	Episode 2	Sounds Like Good	12 July 2012
"Daddy"	2012	—	Episode 2	Sounds Like Good	12 July 2012
"Quirky"	2012	12	Episode 3	Sounds Like Good	19 July 2012
"Censorshit"	2012	—	Episode 3	Sounds Like Good	19 July 2012
"Strategy Wanking"	2012	—	Episode 3	Sounds Like Good	19 July 2012
"Videogames"	2012	21	Episode 4	Sounds Like Good	26 July 2012
"Life Is a Musical"	2012	—	Episode 4	Sounds Like Good	26 July 2012
"Lez Be Friends"	2012	—	Episode 5	Sounds Like Good	2 August 2012
"Just Another Boyband"	2012	—	Episode 5	Sounds Like Good	2 August 2012
"—" denotes a release that did not chart or was not released in that country

== Other charting tracks ==
Year	Title	
Year	Title	UK
2012	"Begging" (from The Midnight Beast sitcom)	70
