= The Midnight Beast (album) =

Studio album by The Midnight Beast
- Released: 9 August 2012
- Recorded: 2010-2012
- Genres: Comedy rap, pop rap
- Length: 53:10 (digital/streaming), 52:48 (CD)
- Label: Sounds Like Good
- Producer: Stefan Abingdon

The Midnight Beast chronology
| Booty Call EP (2010) | The Midnight Beast (2012) | Love Bites EP (2013) |

The Midnight Beast is the self-titled debut album by the UK comedy pop rap band The Midnight Beast, released on August 9, 2012 through their independent label Sounds Like Good. It was released after the first season of the band's sitcom The Midnight Beast had aired, and also acts as its soundtrack companion. The album was released on CD and to digital music retailers.

== Critical reception ==
Professional ratings
Review scores
| Source | Rating |
|---|---|
| NME | 6/10 |
| Metro | 2/5 |

The Midnight Beast received mixed to negative reviews. Mark Beaumont of NME praised the band for its musicality - he described the song "Begging" as being "[catchier than] the clap at a Mayan sun death shag frenzy" - but criticized the album's 'sporadically funny' comedic nature, with "Life is a Musical" and "Censorshit" being singled out as 'misfires'. Metro's Amy Dawson said that despite its "moments of roguish and puerile fun", the album "[fell] short of both Flight of the Concords' straight-faced wit and The Lonely Island's slick vulgarity". Popjustice likened the album to "a pancake liberally smeared with human shit" and called the band "a very low-quality pop-cultural entity"; they were so displeased with the album that they removed all of the articles they did about The Clik Clik, a band that members Stefan Abingdon and Dru Wakely had previously been in, to completely distance themselves of any association with the Midnight Beast.

== Track listing ==
All tracks are written by Stefan Abingdon, Dru Wakely & Ashley Horne, except where noted. All tracks produced by Stefan Abingdon.

The Midnight Beast tracklisting
| No. | Title | Writer(s) | Length |
|---|---|---|---|
| 1. | "I Kicked a Shark in the Face" | Abingdon | 3:14 |
| 2. | "Ninjas" | Abingdon; Wakely | 3:36 |
| 3. | "Begging" | Abingdon | 2:50 |
| 4. | "Medium Pimpin'" | | 2:30 |
| 5. | "Daddy" | Abingdon | 3:08 |
| 6. | "Booty Call" | | 3:37 |
| 7. | "Quirky" | Abingdon | 2:27 |
| 8. | "Censorshit" | Abingdon | 1:47 |
| 9. | "Strategy Wanking" | | 2:53 |
| 10. | "Videogames" | | 2:23 |
| 11. | "Life Is a Musical" | | 3:35 |
| 12. | "Lez Be Friends" | | 4:22 |
| 13. | "Just Another Boyband" (Hidden track (Note: A hidden track, unofficially dubbed "The Secret Track", appears after about two minutes of silence following "Just Another Boyband", making track 13's total length 11:59. This hidden track is present on both the CD and digital/streaming versions.)) | | 4:02 |

Digital bonus tracks
| No. | Title | Writer(s) | Length |
|---|---|---|---|
| 14. | "Too Many Drunk Girls" | Abingdon | 3:06 |
| 15. | "Big Boys" | | 1:41 |

CD bonus tracks
| No. | Title | Writer(s) | Length |
|---|---|---|---|
| 14. | "Nerds" | Abingdon | 2:46 |
| 15. | "Big Boys" | | 1:41 |

== Charts ==
| Chart (2012) | Peak position |
|---|---|
| UK Albums (OCC) | 24 |
| UK Album Downloads (OCC) | 31 |
| UK Independent Albums (OCC) | 4 |
| UK Independent Album Breakers (OCC) | 1 |
| UK Physical Albums (OCC) | 22 |
| Scottish Albums (OCC) | 38 |
