= Tik Tok (song) =

2009 single by Kesha

Single by Kesha

from the album Animal
- Released: August 7, 2009
- Recorded: January 2009
- Studio: Conway Recording Studios, Los Angeles
- Genre: Dance-pop; electropop; bitpop
- Length: 3:19
- Label: RCA
- Songwriters: Kesha Sebert; Lukasz Gottwald; Benjamin Levin
- Producers: Dr. Luke; Benny Blanco

Kesha singles chronology
"Right Round" (2009)	"Tik Tok" (2009)	"Blah Blah Blah" (2010)

Music video
- "Tik Tok" on YouTube

"Tik Tok" (stylized as "TiK ToK") is the debut solo single by American singer Kesha, who co-wrote the song with its producers Dr. Luke and Benny Blanco. It was released on August 7, 2009, as the lead single from her debut studio album, Animal (2010). According to Kesha, the song's lyrics are representative of her and based on her life.

In the lyrics, which have a carefree message, the narrator talks about not letting anything bring them down. "Tik Tok" is a pop and EDM song incorporating Auto-Tune and a minimalist bitpop beat interspersed with handclaps and synthesizers. The verses use a rap/sing vocal style while the chorus and bridge is sung. Some critics complimented the production as catchy, but others took issue with it as generic and disposable compared to the mainstream pop music scene.

In the United States, "Tik Tok" spent nine weeks atop the Billboard Hot 100 and ended up being certified 12× Platinum by the Recording Industry Association of America (RIAA). Topping the charts in many other countries including Australia—where it was certified ninefold platinum, Canada, France, Germany, Norway, and Switzerland, it was the best-selling single worldwide in 2010, and has sold 14 million digital copies worldwide. Furthermore, it is currently listed as the 68th biggest Billboard Hot 100 hit of all time.

== Background and development ==
In 2005, Dr. Luke had just finished producing tracks for Kelly Clarkson's album Breakaway (2004) and was looking to expand further on his writing and producing credits. Luke solicited around to different people in the music business asking for demos from unknown artists. Two of the demos he received were from Katy Perry and Kesha. He was particularly taken with Kesha's demos which consisted of a self-penned country ballad and trip-hop track. The latter of the demos caught Luke off guard when she ran out of lyrics and started to rap, "I'm a white girl/From the 'Ville/Nashville, bitch. Uhh. Uhhhhh." The improvisation made her stand out from other artists that Luke had listened to, which he recalled: "That's when I was like, 'OK, I like this girl's personality. When you're listening to 100 CDs, that kind of bravado and chutzpah stand out." Following this, at the age of eighteen, Kesha signed to Luke's label, Kemosabe Records, and his publishing company, Prescription Songs.

After being signed to Luke's label she also signed to David Sonenberg's DAS management company. While at the label she worked with record producer Greg Wells, which she attributes to developing her sound on her first record, Animal (2010). Although she was signed to Luke and his label, Kesha never took priority as he was busy with other projects at the time. It was not until 2008 when Luke was working with Flo Rida on "Right Round" that he pulled Kesha in to contribute, giving her the female hook. Within a few months, the song became a worldwide hit. The event led to different labels sparking interest in signing her, including RCA Records, to which she eventually signed.

== Writing and recording ==
"I tried to rewrite the verses of 'TiK ToK,' I was like, 'This doesn't make sense. "Brushing your teeth with Jack Daniel's"-are people going to get what I'm talking about? Is this too much? Is it clever enough?' And he [Dr. Luke] literally had to fight me off, and then Benny Blanco had to chase me out of the studio when I got a mind to rewrite it."

— Kesha on wanting to rewrite the track due to fear of not making a connection with the audience.

"Tik Tok" was written by Kesha, alongside Dr. Luke and Benny Blanco and was co-produced by Luke and Blanco. Kesha said the inspiration behind the song came from coming home half-drunk and stumbling after a night out of partying. She would then write down a few words to a song, and then the following morning she would wake up with the story waiting to be told. The opening line came from an experience where she woke up surrounded by "beautiful women", leading to her imagining Sean Combs, known professionally as P. Diddy, being in a similar scenario. She then proceeded to bring the song to her producer Dr. Luke and Benny Blanco and the song was written. Four hours later, Diddy called Luke and said that they should do a song together. Diddy came to the studio later that day to contribute his lines and the collaboration was completed.

Engineering of the song was done by Emily Wright and Sam Holland at Conway Recording Studios in Los Angeles, California. While Kesha was in the studio with Dr. Luke and Blanco, she took three takes to get the song correct as she jokingly "white-girl rapped" over the beat. At one point in the song's production, she had wanted to re-write the verses of the song because she did not think that they were "funny or clever", feeling that they "kind of sucked." She elaborated, "I thought it was just another song, I thought it was just like all the other ones I'd written. I didn't even know if it was very good. I wanted to rewrite the verses, I didn't think it was funny or clever. I thought it kind of sucked. But everyone else liked it." Kesha ultimately did not end up rewriting any of the song's lyrics. She further described the theme of the song in an interview, emphasizing that it embodied her own lifestyle,

We're [Kesha and her friends] all young and broke and it doesn't matter. We can find clothes on the side of the street and go out and look fantastic, and kill it. If we don't have a car that doesn't stop us, because we'll take the bus. If we can't afford drinks, we'll bring a bottle in our purse. It's just about not letting anything bring you down.

== Composition ==
"Tik Tok"
A sample of the song "Tik Tok" with spoken word/rapped verses enhanced with the use of Auto-Tune.

"Tik Tok" is an upbeat dance-pop and electropop song that incorporates the sound of '80s video game noises in its production, to earn a bitpop beat.

Kesha uses a spoken word rap style in the verses while the chorus is sung. Throughout the song Kesha's vocals are heavily enhanced by Auto-Tune. The song also features two lines by P. Diddy ("Hey, what up girl?", which is said after he is mentioned in the lyrics, and "Let's go!") Lyrically, the song speaks about "excess pleasures, from drinking ('Ain't got a care in the world but I got plenty of beer') to men ('We kick 'em to the curb unless they look like Mick Jagger')." According to Kesha the lyrics are representative of herself, stating, "It's about my life. It's 100 percent me."

Kesha uses a rap vocal delivery which was influenced by the Beastie Boys. She claims that the track's creation would not have happened if it was not for their influence on her music. While the song was being crafted she took a different vocal approach to the song than in her earlier records, explaining, "I've done the country, done the pop-rock, done the super-hard electro, ... I was like, whatever, throw some rap in there, why not?" The song is in common time with a moderate beat rate of 120 beats per minute. The song is set in the key of D minor. It has the sequence of B♭–C–Dm as its chord progression and Kesha's vocals span from D_{3} to D_{5}, similar to that of "California Gurls" by Katy Perry. Musically, the song has been compared to Lady Gaga's debut single, "Just Dance", for their similar composition and lyrical context and to Fergie for their similar rap style.

== Release and promotion ==
In July 2009, the song was offered as a free download on Kesha's Myspace page for over a month before its official sale release. The song was later released to iTunes on August 7, 2009, and on August 25, 2009, in the United States. Barry Weiss of RCA/Jive Label Group relied on a similar marketing scheme to that of Britney Spears' in 1999 when choosing to give the song away for free. The song's marketing relied heavily on radio once she had achieved a strong online interest, but its radio release was delayed until October in order to capitalize on social media interest in her. The song quickly topped iTunes charts after. The song appeared in the 2011 film Diary of a Wimpy Kid: Rodrick Rules. It was also featured in the notorious "couch gag" for the television show The Simpsons.

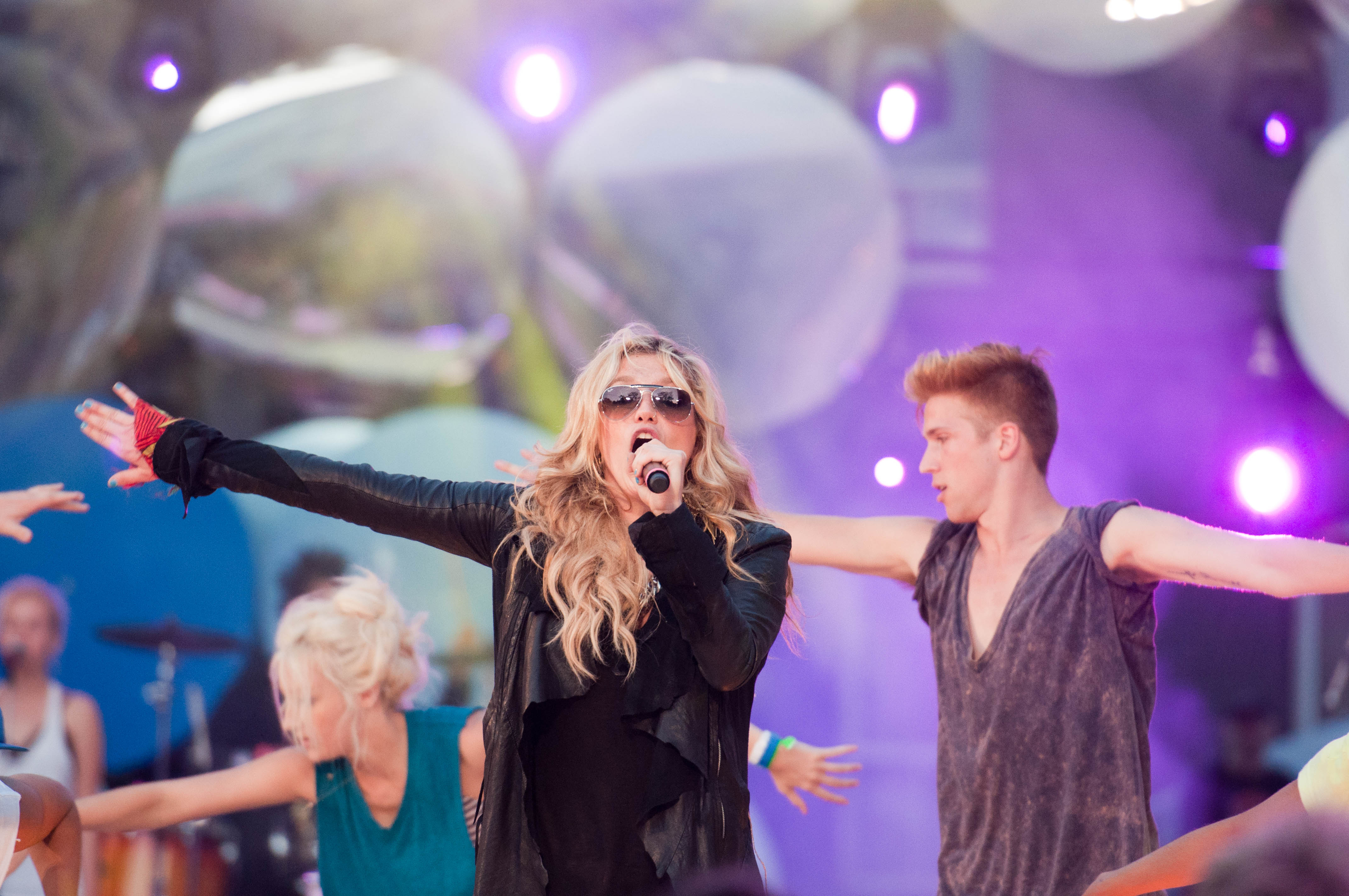
Kesha rehearsing "Tik Tok" for the Much Music Video Awards on June 18, 2010

To promote the single, Kesha made several television appearances and performances across the world. The first televised performance of the song was on a part of MTV Push, a program broadcast on MTV Networks worldwide, where she performed the song alongside her other tracks "Blah Blah Blah" and "Dinosaur". She performed the song alongside "Blah Blah Blah", "Take It Off", "Your Love Is My Drug" and "Dirty Picture" in a set for BBC Radio 1's Big Weekend. On May 29, 2010, Kesha performed "Tik Tok" alongside "Your Love Is My Drug" at the MTV Video Music Awards Japan.

Kesha has also made appearances on It's On with Alexa Chung, The Wendy Williams Show, Lopez Tonight, Late Night with Jimmy Fallon, The Tonight Show with Conan O'Brien and The Ellen DeGeneres Show to perform the song. This song was also performed on Saturday Night Live in a season 35 episode hosted by Ryan Phillippe on April 17, 2010. On August 13, 2010, Kesha performed "Tik Tok" on Today. On November 7, 2010, Kesha performed the song at the MTV Europe Music Awards. Throughout the performance, she was seen wearing a leotard with day-glow makeup. The performance featured a backing consisting of flashing lights and background dancers. The song's bridge was changed during the performance and featured a more "amping house music vibe".

== Critical reception ==
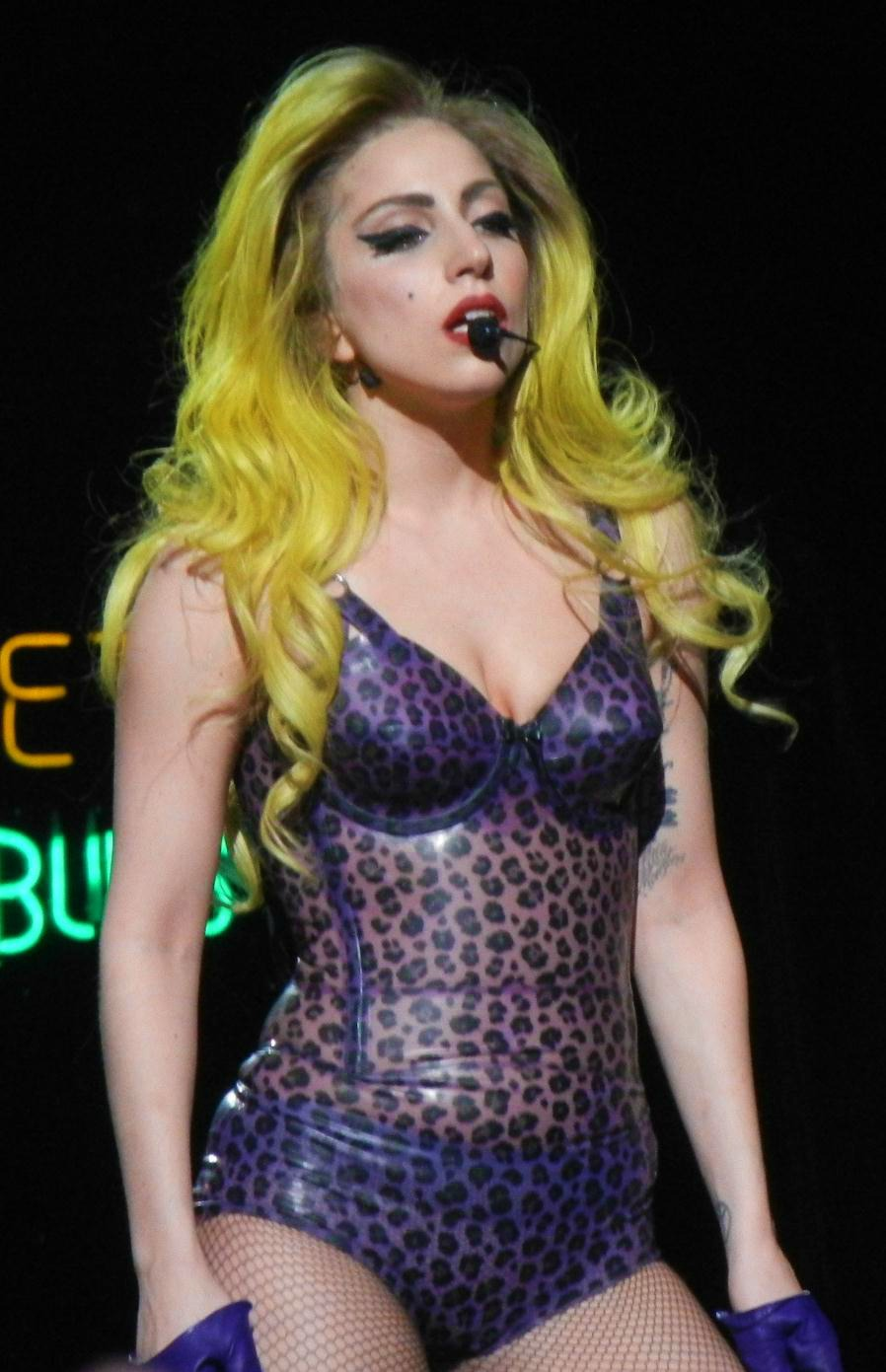
Multiple critics compared "Tik Tok" to American singer Lady Gaga's (pictured) debut single, "Just Dance", for their similar subject matter.

Kelsey Paine of Billboard called the song "a love letter to DJs everywhere, with hand claps that build to a crescendo of pure, infectious dance-pop." Paine, referring to her appearance on "Right Round", wrote that she "offers her own fun and frivolous ode to a wild night out" as she sings about drinking and men. The review was concluded with the consensus the Kesha's debut "reveals a knack for getting the party started." Jim Farber of the New York Daily News called the song "a vintage lick of dance candy too tooth-rottingly sweet to resist" that featured a "stabbing synthesizer hook". Fraser McAlpine of the BBC, giving the single four out of a possible five stars, called it a "dirty little ditty" that had "'hit' written all over it". McAlpine noted its similarities to Lady Gaga's "Just Dance" for their partying subject matter, but concedes that "she does make it sound kinda fun though." Billy Johnson Jr. of Yahoo! compared "Tik Tok" to the 1988 L'Trimm hit "Cars That Go Boom" and notes that Kesha has "take[n] on L'Trimm's vocal styling for her own hit."

Nick Levine of Digital Spy gave the song four out of five stars. He spoke of the song giving Kesha a "hussy image" but described the lyrics in a positive manner. Levine said the use of auto-tune was "fun" and described Dr. Luke's backing track as "bouncy" and "bubblegummy". The review highlighted the song's chorus with Levine calling it "stonking great" and "completely trashy in the best possible way." David Jeffries of AllMusic called the track "fun", listing it as one of the album's best tracks. David Renshaw of Drowned in Sound felt that the song was effective in what it was trying to do, writing: "Trashy and rambunctious, it's a brash summer anthem about getting drunk and partying hard. World rocking it might not be, but as a piece of disposable pop it captures a moment and boasts a huge hook which, really, is all you need to rule the radio, TV and ringtone airwaves." Mikael Wood of Entertainment Weekly listed the song as the recommended download off of Animal, writing that "her Valley Girl sneer with electro-glam arrangements that make brushing one's teeth 'with a bottle of Jack' sound like an awesome way to kill the morning-after blues."

Jonah Weiner of Slate Magazine gave the song a negative review saying that "the song sets up ship on the fault line between charmingly daft and deeply irritating." He then compared the song to work by other artists, stating that "the rapped verses are sub-Fergie-grade, proudly stuffed with groaners and to-hell-with-the-expiration-date slang." Weiner echoed the sentiment that the plotline seemed like "a sequel" to "Just Dance", summing it up as "girl wakes up drunk, stays drunk, finds a dance floor and (spoiler alert) gets even drunker." Jon Caramanica of The New York Times described the song as "a zippy and salacious celebration of late nights and mornings-after." He noted that "some have compared Kesha, unfavorably, to Uffie, who is signed to the influential French electronic music label Ed Banger and whose sass-rap predated Kesha's by a couple of years." However, he thought that "if anyone should feel fleeced by 'Tik Tok', though, it's Lady Gaga, who probably hears significant chunks of her hit 'Just Dance' in its melody and subject matter."

== Commercial performance ==
In the United States, "Tik Tok" debuted at number 79 on the Billboard Hot 100 on the week ending October 24, 2009. It was the first Hot 100 number one of the 2010s decade and stayed at the top for nine consecutive weeks. On the week ending December 31, 2009, "Tik Tok" broke the record for the highest U.S. single-week sales by a female artist, selling 610,000 digital downloads, just behind her feature on Flo Rida's "Right Round", which had sold 636,000 downloads on its opening week. The record was surpassed by Taylor Swift's "We Are Never Ever Getting Back Together" (2012) when it sold 623,000 digital copies in its debut week. On the week ending February 6, 2010, "Tik Tok" topped the Pop Songs chart with 11,224 spins on airplay, breaking the record by Lady Gaga's "Bad Romance" for the most single-week plays on pop radio. On Billboard's year-end charts of 2010, it topped the Hot 100 and placed at number seven on Radio Songs and number eight on Digital Songs. By March 2016, "Tik Tok" had sold 6.8 million digital downloads in the United States. Furthermore, the single has since been certified 12× Platinum in the United States as of September 2024 by the nation's RIAA (Recording Industry Association of America), for combined sales and streaming equivalent-units in excess of 12 million in the country. With this feat, Kesha has accumulated two RIAA Diamond certified singles, alongside her feature on American rapper Pitbull's 2013 hit "Timber".

The single also peaked atop the Canadian Hot 100 and was certified seven times platinum by Music Canada. "Tik Tok" peaked atop the singles charts of European and Oceanic countries including Australia, France, Germany, New Zealand, Norway, and Switzerland. It was certified nine times platinum by the Australian Recording Industry Association and six times platinum by Recorded Music NZ. In the United Kingdom, "Tik Tok" peaked at number four on the UK Singles Chart and by 2012, ranked at number 100 on the Official Charts Company's list of the 150 best-selling singles of the 21st century. In South Korea, "Tik Tok" was the best-selling digital single by a foreign artist of 2010, selling 1.4 million downloads. According to the IFPI (International Federation of the Phonographic Industry), the single had sold 12.8 million digital copies worldwide in 2010, three million more than Lady Gaga's "Poker Face" which had topped the chart the previous year, thus making it the best-selling digital single of that year. Furthermore, it is also the first single ever to cross more than 10 million digital downloads sold globally.

== Music video ==
The music video for "Tik Tok" was directed by Syndrome. It was shot in Kesha's old neighborhood and the car featured in the video belongs to her. Kesha explained the experience saying, "the video I'm excited about because I actually got to shoot it in my old neighborhood and the guy driving my gold car is a friend of mine". The video's party scene was shot in her friend's house, which they refer to as the "drunk tank". The singer said "the last party scene is in this house called the drunk tank, which is one of my friend's houses that we all go party at. So I like it 'cause it's super honest and genuine."

The video begins with Kesha waking in a bathtub in a home as she stumbles out and begins to look for a toothbrush in the restroom. She makes her way down a staircase looking at the pictures lining the wall. Kesha makes her way to the kitchen and walks in on a family who are having breakfast, startling them. She shrugs and then leaves the home as the family gets up and follows her. When she arrives at the sidewalk, she picks up a gold bicycle lying against a fallen fence and rides off. Kesha meets a group of children and trades the bicycle for their boombox. The video cuts to another scene where she rejects a guy and is picked up by a man (Simon Rex) who drives her in a gold 1978 Trans Am. They are pulled over by the police, who handcuff Kesha. The scene then pans to her singing while standing in the T-top as she dangles the handcuffs hanging from her left arm. The next scene shows Kesha in an empty room filled with glitter. She then attends a party with Rex for the final scene. The video comes to an end with Kesha lying in a different bathtub from the one she woke up in, while Spanish voices in Mexican accents are heard in a market-like way, implying she ended up crossing the border. The official music video has received over 700 million views on YouTube as of January 2025.

== Cover versions and parodies ==
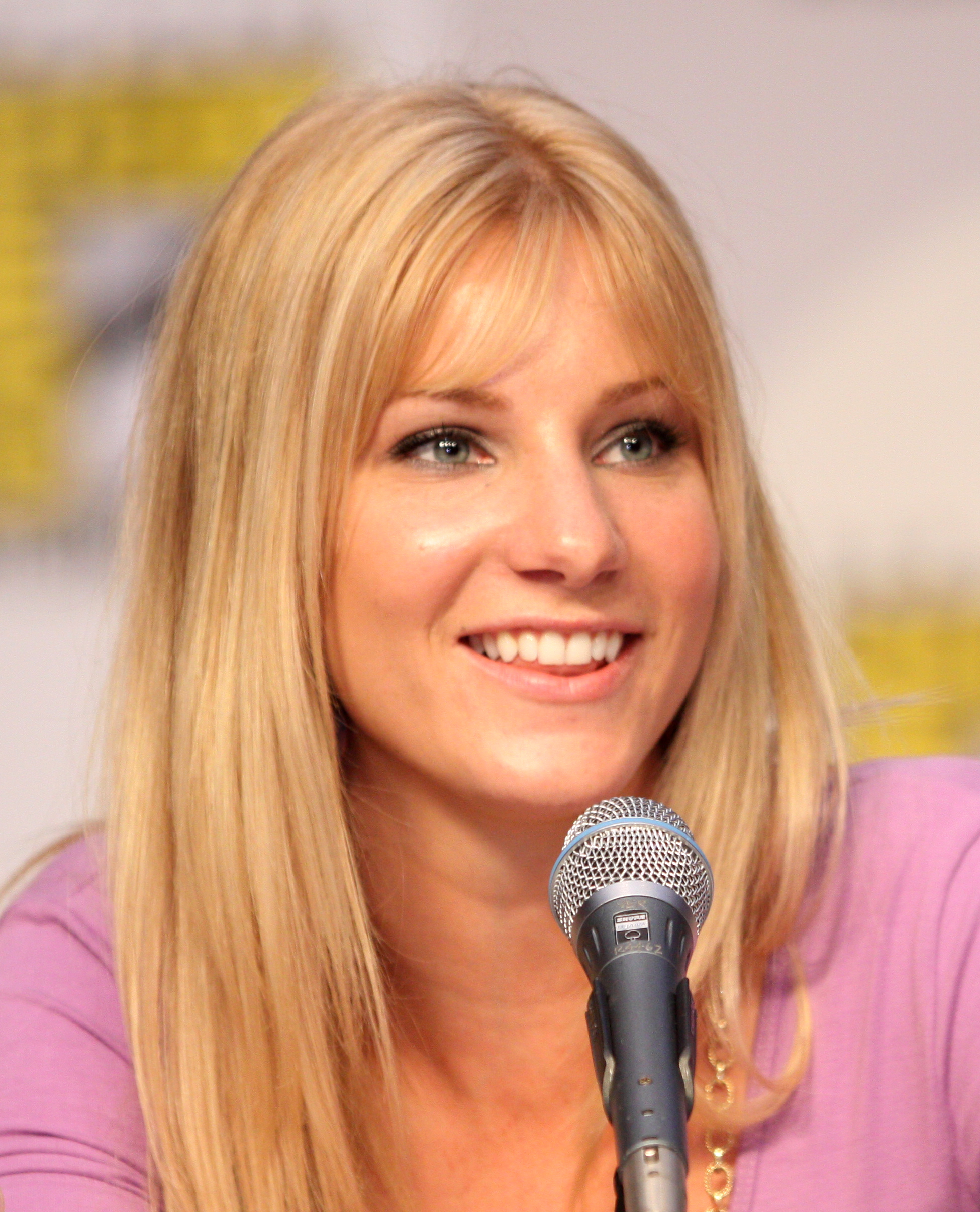
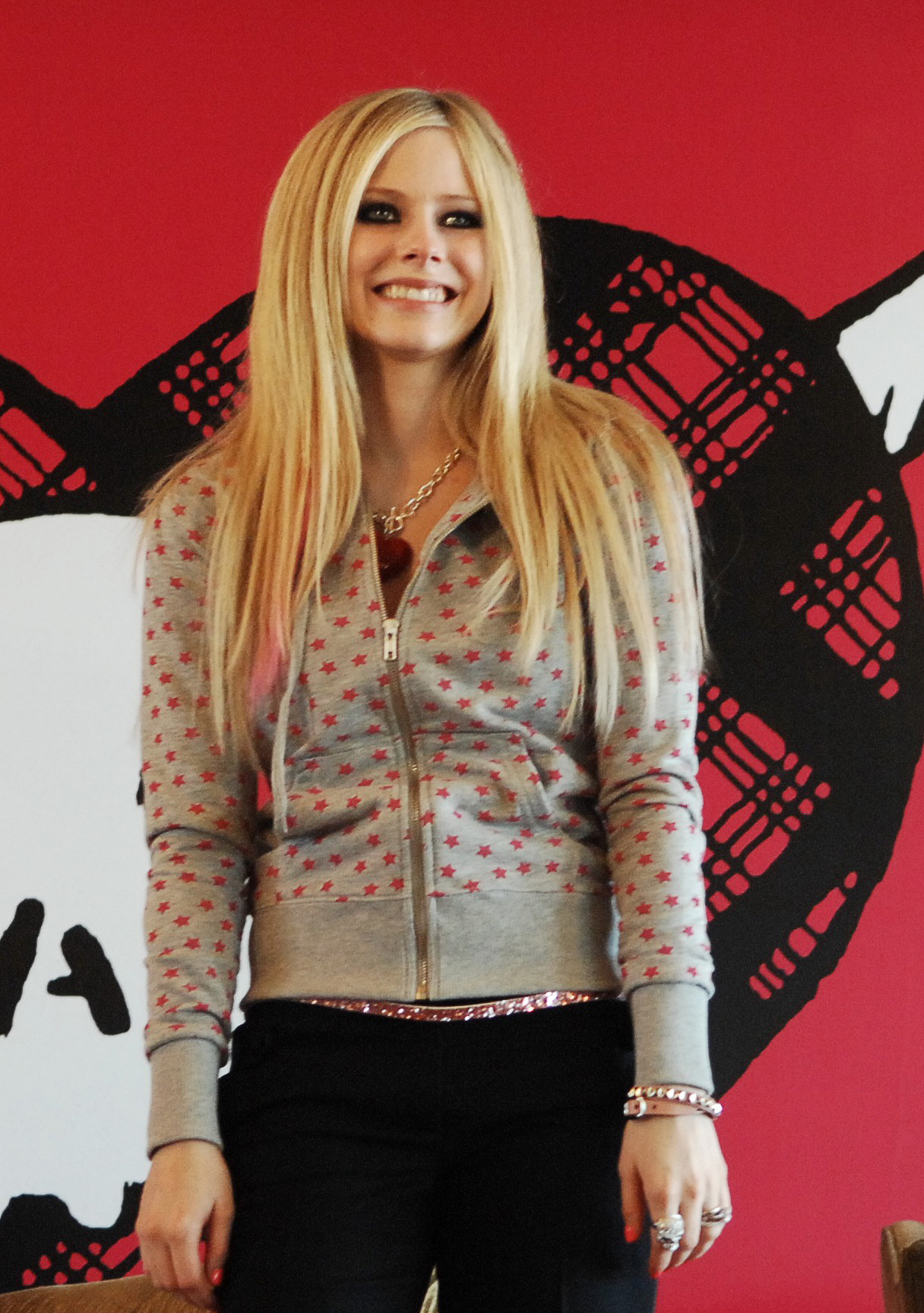
Heather Morris (left) and Avril Lavigne (right) both performed covers of the song—Morris in an episode of Glee and Lavigne in a live rendition for BBC Radio.

The second-most-viewed YouTube video of the year 2010, behind only the "Bed Intruder Song" by Antoine Dodson and the Gregory Brothers featuring Kelly Dodson, was a parody of "Tik Tok" posted by the Key of Awesome.

American metalcore band Woe, Is Me recorded and released a cover of Tik Tok, also showcased online within a few months of being a band. Soon after these recordings were released, The Artery Foundation took notice of them. Rise Records, along with their imprint label, Velocity Records, signed Woe, Is Me before even playing their first show.

"Weird Al" Yankovic included the chorus in his polka medley "Polka Face" from his 2011 album Alpocalypse.

The song was also parodied by British comedy group the Midnight Beast. The parody discusses youthful subjects such as attempting to view the nude bodies of women and dodging parents' anger. Released to iTunes on January 15, 2010, the parody peaked at number four on the Australian Singles Chart, and at thirty-nine on the Irish Singles Chart.

Comedian Julie Brown parodied the song with the single "Another Drunk Chick" on her album Smell the Glamour (2011).

Avril Lavigne performed an acoustic version of the song in her setlist for BBC Radio 1.

It's amazing ... I love it. ... Having Israeli soldiers dancing to 'Tik Tok' and landing the opening of 'The Simpsons' ... [they're] dreams. It's been a pretty good year.

— Kesha commenting on The Simpsons and Israel Defense Forces soldiers parodies

Another parody came about when Israel Defense Forces soldiers created "IDF Tik Tok" in 2010, a viral dance video that opens with six infantry soldiers on patrol in Hebron, walking cautiously down a deserted street, armed and wearing full combat gear, when "Tik Tok" begins to play, and the soldiers break into choreographed dance moves.

"Tik Tok" was used in the opening sequence for The Simpsons season 21 episode "To Surveil with Love" in 2010, in which the entire cast lip-synced to the song and the sequence itself matched the lyrics of the song.

The cast of Fox musical series Glee performed this song on the 2011 season 2 episode "Blame It on the Alcohol", with Heather Morris' character, Brittany Pierce, taking the lead. The episode revolved around teen drinking and its dangers. The members of Glee Club are asked to perform at the school's alcohol awareness assembly, in which "Tik Tok" is one of the songs performed. Emily St. James of The A.V. Club wrote that the song's inclusion in the episode was superfluous, stating that it was just an excuse to get a Kesha song on Glee. St. James however, wrote that she "REALLY liked Heather Morris'" rendition of the song.

Sandra Gonzalez of Entertainment Weekly praised Morris' choreography and overall performance in "Tik Tok", writing, "The huge star of this number was clearly Brittany, who more and more every week proves that she needs to be moved to the forefront of this show's big performances and storylines." Gonzalez gave the cover version of "Tik Tok" a B, calling it "pure, fun entertainment up until we got to the part straight out of the mind of Gordie LaChance".

Erica Futterman of Rolling Stone gave the cover version of "Tik Tok" a mostly positive review, writing, "Love Brittany as we do, we wish Rachel or Mercedes stepped up to the mic. The performance is less risqué than their Pep Rally 'Push It' but winds up causing more controversy when Brittany pukes on Rachel and Santana also vomits up grey slush. It's a fitting end to the song, and the episode."

During the fifth season of The Masked Singer, Caitlyn Jenner sang the song disguised as the "Phoenix”. Jenner's rendition went viral and Kesha eventually reacted to it on the coincidentally similarly named app TikTok.

== Lyrical changes ==
In November 2023, Kesha began altering the lyric "wake up in the morning feeling like P. Diddy" in light of the Sean Combs sexual misconduct allegations. During this performance, she initially changed the lyric to "wake up in the morning feeling just like me". While performing the song with singer Reneé Rapp at Rapp's Coachella 2024 set, however, the pair performed the lyric as "wake up in the morning, like, 'Fuck P. Diddy'" whilst giving the middle finger. Kesha has stated that she plans to sing the Coachella version of the lyrics going forward and has encouraged fans to learn this version of the song in order to sing along at concerts.

== Accolades ==
Accolades for "Tik Tok"
Year	Organization	Award	Result	Ref.
2010	LOS40 Music Awards	Best International Song	Nominated	
2010	MTV Video Music Awards	Best New Artist	Nominated	
2010	MTV Video Music Awards	Best Female Video	Nominated	
2010	MTV Video Music Awards	Best Pop Video	Nominated	
2010	MuchMusic Video Awards	International Video of the Year – Artist	Nominated	
2010	MuchMusic Video Awards	UR Fave: International Video	Nominated	
2010	Nickelodeon Australian Kids' Choice Awards	Fave Song	Nominated	
2011	ASCAP Pop Music Awards	Most Performed Song	Won	
2011	BMI Pop Music Awards	Award-Winning Songs	Won	

== Track listing ==
- US single
1. "Tik Tok" – 3:14
- Germany/UK single
1. "Tik Tok" – 3:14
2. "Tik Tok" (Tom Neville's Crunk & Med Mix) – 6:53
- UK EP
1. "Tik Tok" – 3:14
2. "Tik Tok" (Fred Falke Club Remix) – 6:42
3. "Tik Tok" (Chuck Buckett's Verucca Salt Remix Remix) – 4:55
4. "Tik Tok" (Tom Neville's Crunk & Med Mix) – 6:53
5. "Tik Tok" (Untold Remix) – 5:01

== Credits and personnel ==
Recording

- Recorded at Conway Recording Studios, Los Angeles, California

Personnel

- Background vocals – Kesha, P. Diddy
- Lead vocals – Kesha
- Songwriting – Kesha Sebert, Lukasz Gottwald, Benjamin Levin
- Production – Lukasz Gottwald, Benjamin Levin
- Instruments and programming – Lukasz Gottwald, Benjamin Levin
- Recording – Lukasz Gottwald, Benjamin Levin
- Audio engineering – Emily Wright, Sam Holland
- Vocal editing – Emily Wright

Credits adapted from the liner notes of Animal, Dynamite Cop Music/Where Da Kasz At BMI.

== Charts ==
=== Weekly charts ===
Weekly chart performance for "Tik Tok"
Chart (2009–2011)	Peak position
Australia (ARIA)	1
Australia (ARIA Dance)	1
Austria (Ö3 Austria Top 40)	1
Belgium (Ultratop 50 Flanders)	4
Belgium (Ultratop 50 Wallonia)	1
Bulgaria (BAMP)	3
Canada Hot 100 (Billboard)	1
Canada CHR/Top 40 (Billboard)	1
Canada Hot AC (Billboard)	1
CIS Airplay (TopHit)	1
Croatia International Airplay (HRT)	1
Czech Republic Airplay (ČNS IFPI)	2
Denmark (Tracklisten)	3
Europe (Billboard Euro Digital Songs)	2
Europe (European Hot 100 Singles)	1
Finland (Suomen virallinen lista)	2
France (SNEP)	1
Germany (GfK)	1
Global Dance Songs (Billboard)	2
Greece Digital Song Sales (Billboard)	1
Hungary (Dance Top 40)	4
Hungary (Rádiós Top 40)	2
Ireland (IRMA)	3
Israel International Airplay (Media Forest)	1
Italy (FIMI)	2
Italy Airplay (EarOne)	5
Japan Hot 100 (Billboard)	3
Japan Adult Contemporary (Billboard)	2
Latvia (European Hit Radio)	1
Lithuania (European Hit Radio)	1
Luxembourg Digital Song Sales (Billboard)	1
Mexico Airplay (Billboard)	6
Mexico Anglo (Monitor Latino)	2
Mexico Ingles Airplay (Billboard)	1
Netherlands (Dutch Top 40)	2
Netherlands (Mega Top 50)	5
Netherlands (Single Top 100)	6
New Zealand (Recorded Music NZ)	1
Norway (VG-lista)	1
Poland (Airplay Chart)	5
Poland Dance (ZPAV)	5
Portugal Digital Song Sales (Billboard)	9
Romania Airplay (Media Forest)	3
Romania TV Airplay (Media Forest)	2
Russia Airplay (TopHit)	2
Scottish Singles Sales (Official Charts)	4
Slovakia Airplay (ČNS IFPI)	2
Spain (Promusicae)	5
South Korea (Gaon)	12
South Korea Foreign (Gaon)	1
Sweden (Sverigetopplistan)	3
Switzerland (Schweizer Hitparade)	1
UK Singles (Official Charts)	4
Ukraine Airplay (TopHit)	7
US Billboard Hot 100	1
US Adult Pop Airplay (Billboard)	14
US Dance Club Songs (Billboard)	11
US Dance Airplay (Billboard)	1
US Hot Latin Songs (Billboard)	20
US Pop Airplay (Billboard)	1
US Rhythmic Airplay (Billboard)	2

=== Monthly charts ===
Monthly chart performance for "Tik Tok"
Chart (2010)	Position
Brazil (Brasil Hot 100 Airplay)	1
Brazil (Brasil Hot Pop Songs)	1
CIS (TopHit)	2

=== Year-end charts ===
Year-end chart performance for "Tik Tok"
Chart (2009)	Position
Australia (ARIA)	9
Australia (ARIA Dance)	3
Canada Hot 100 (Billboard)	76
CIS (TopHit)	195
Netherlands (Dutch Top 40)	48
Netherlands (Single Top 100)	90
New Zealand (Recorded Music NZ)	4
Norway (VG-lista)	17
Sweden (Sverigetopplistan)	60
UK Singles (Official Charts)	45

Chart (2010)	Position
Australia (ARIA)	12
Australia (ARIA Dance)	1
Austria (Ö3 Austria Top 40)	3
Belgium (Ultratop Flanders)	21
Belgium (Ultratop Wallonia)	3
Brazil (Crowley)	4
Canada Hot 100 (Billboard)	2
CIS Airplay (TopHit)	12
CIS (TopHit)	9
Croatia International Airplay (HRT)	9
Denmark (Tracklisten)	45
European Hot 100 Singles (Billboard)	2
Finland (Suomen virallinen lista)	5
France (SNEP)	9
Germany (GfK)	10
Hungary (Dance Top 100)	23
Hungary (Rádiós Top 100)	7
Italy (FIMI)	3
Italy Airplay (EarOne)	24
Japan Hot 100 (Billboard)	21
Japan Adult Contemporary (Billboard)	3
Japan Radio Songs (Billboard)	5
Netherlands (Dutch Top 40)	32
Netherlands (Single Top 100)	99
New Zealand (Recorded Music NZ)	46
Romania (Airplay 100)	58
Russia Airplay (TopHit)	17
South Korea (Gaon)	122
South Korea Foreign (Gaon)	3
Spain (Promusicae)	13
Spain Top 20 Airplay (Promusicae)	2
Sweden (Sverigetopplistan)	62
Switzerland (Schweizer Hitparade)	6
Taiwan (Hito Radio)	34
UK Singles (Official Charts)	69
Ukraine Airplay (TopHit)	27
US Billboard Hot 100	1
US Adult Pop Airplay (Billboard)	42
US Dance/Mix Show Airplay (Billboard)	4
US Pop Airplay (Billboard)	1
US Radio Songs (Billboard)	3
US Rhythmic Airplay (Billboard)	9
Worldwide (IFPI)	1

Chart (2011)	Position
Australia (ARIA Dance)	48
Russia Airplay (TopHit)	161
South Korea Foreign (Gaon)	112

Chart (2012)	Position
South Korea Foreign (Gaon)	41

Chart (2013)	Position
South Korea Foreign (Gaon)	70

Chart (2017)	Position
Australia (ARIA Dance)	99

Chart (2018)	Position
Australia (ARIA Dance)	86

Chart (2019)	Position
Australia (ARIA Dance)	61

Chart (2020)	Position
Australia (ARIA Dance)	40

Chart (2021)	Position
Australia (ARIA Dance)	38

Chart (2022)	Position
Australia (ARIA Dance)	47

Chart (2023)	Position
Australia (ARIA Dance)	50

Chart (2024)	Position
Australia (ARIA Dance)	29

Chart (2025)	Position
Australia (ARIA Dance)	38

=== Decade-end charts ===
Decade-end chart performance for "Tik Tok"
Chart (2000–2009)	Position
Australia (ARIA)	42
Chart (2010–2019)	Position
US Billboard Hot 100	24

=== Centurial charts ===
Centurial chart performance for "Tik Tok"
Chart	Position
US Billboard Hot 100 21st century	31

=== All-time charts ===
All-time chart performance for "Tik Tok"
Chart	Position
US Billboard Hot 100	68
US Billboard Hot 100 (Women)	18
US Pop Airplay (Billboard)	13

== Certifications and sales ==
Certifications and sales for "Tik Tok"
Region	Certification	Certified units/sales
Australia (ARIA)	9× Platinum	630,000^{‡}
Austria (IFPI Austria)	Platinum	30,000^{*}
Belgium (BRMA)	Platinum	30,000^{*}
Canada (Music Canada) Digital Download	7× Platinum	280,000^{*}
Canada (Music Canada) Ringtone	Platinum	40,000^{*}
Denmark (IFPI Danmark)	2× Platinum	180,000^{‡}
Finland (Musiikkituottajat)	Gold	5,910
France (SNEP)	Gold	150,000^{*}
Germany (BVMI)	3× Platinum	900,000^{‡}
Italy (FIMI)	2× Platinum	60,000^{*}
Japan (RIAJ) digital	Platinum	250,000^{*}
Japan (RIAJ) Full-length ringtone	Gold	100,000^{*}
Mexico (AMPROFON)	Platinum	60,000^{*}
New Zealand (RMNZ)	6× Platinum	180,000^{‡}
South Korea (Gaon)	—	2,512,000
Spain (Promusicae)	Platinum	40,000^{*}
Sweden (GLF)	Platinum	40,000^{‡}
Switzerland (IFPI Switzerland)	Platinum	30,000^{^}
United Kingdom (BPI)	3× Platinum	1,800,000^{‡}
United States (RIAA)	12× Platinum	12,000,000^{‡}
Summaries
Worldwide	—	14,000,000
^{*} Sales figures based on certification alone.^{^} Shipments figures based on certification alone.^{‡} Sales+streaming figures based on certification alone.

== Release history ==
Release dates and formats for "Tik Tok"
Region	Date	Format	Label	Ref.
Australia	August 7, 2009	Digital download	RCA/Jive	
Canada	August 7, 2009	Digital download	RCA/Jive	
Mexico	August 7, 2009	Digital download	RCA/Jive	
New Zealand	August 7, 2009	Digital download	RCA/Jive	
Norway	August 7, 2009	Digital download	RCA/Jive	
Sweden	August 7, 2009	Digital download	RCA/Jive	
United States	August 25, 2009	Digital download	RCA	
United States	October 5, 2009	Contemporary hit radio	RCA	
United Kingdom	November 2, 2009	Digital download	RCA/Jive	
South Korea	December 8, 2009	Digital download	Sony	
