= All Killer =

All Killer (Original Motion Picture Soundtrack)

Soundtrack album by The Midnight Beast
- Released: 23 August 2016
- Genre: Comedy, Soundtrack
- Label: Sounds Like Good
- Producer: Stefan Abingdon, Dru Wakely

The Midnight Beast chronology
Shtick Heads (2014)	All Killer (Original Motion Picture Soundtrack) (2016)

All Killer is a soundtrack album by The Midnight Beast for their short-film musical of the same name.

The film was a musical starring the members of the band as well as Jemma McKenzie-Brown (who starred as Bea). The musical is set in a university, with Ashley Horne acting as a popular member of the Glee club, Stefan Abingdon acting as a mid-profile producer with aspirations of becoming a producer, and Dru Wakely playing a bottom-class nerd that is in control of the lights for the Glee club. Jemma McKenzie-Brown stars as the head of the Glee club, the most popular girl in school whom lip syncs in a bid to act as though she is an accomplished singer. The film is left with an ending that allows for the viewer to question the murder of Bea.

All Killer was heavily publicised through The Midnight Beast's social media accounts, including the movie's trailer being premiered on the band's YouTube account.

== Track listing ==
All lyrics by Stefan Abingdon, Ashley Horne, Dru Wakely, Tom George, and Daniel Berg. All songs were also credited as featuring 'the Cast of All Killer'.

All Killer
No.	Title	Length
1.	"All Killer Opening (Bea's Theme)"	0:52
2.	"Spotlight (Keep the Light on Me)"	2:08
3.	"Beat Myself off"	2:20
4.	"Dru's Secret"	0:54
5.	"Dru's Banana Song"	0:27
6.	"Whodunnit"	2:47
Total length:		6:41
