= Love Bites =

Love Bites may refer to:

- Love-bite or hickey, a small bruise caused by kissing, sucking, or biting the skin

== Film and television ==
- Love Bites (TV series), a 2011 drama starring Becki Newton
- Lovebites (TV series), a 2002 New Zealand comedy television series
- Love Bites (film), a 1993 comedy starring Adam Ant
- Love Bites (Les Morsures de l'aube), a 2001 French thriller starring Guillaume Canet and Asia Argento
- Lovebites, a 2006 American adaptation of the Québécois TV sitcom Un gars, une fille
- Love Bites, a series of Valentine's Day-themed shorts from Happy Tree Friends
- "Love Bites" (Dawson's Creek), a 2003 television episode

== Music ==
- Love Bites (band), a UK group
- Lovebites (band), a Japanese heavy metal group
- Love Bites (album), a 1978 album by Buzzcocks
- Love Bites (EP), by The Midnight Beast

=== Songs ===
- "Love Bites" (Def Leppard song)
- "Love Bites" (Grace Jones song)
- "Love Bites" (Nelly Furtado, Tove Lo and SG Lewis song)
- "Love Bites" a song by Judas Priest from Defenders of the Faith
- "Love Bites (So Do I)", a 2012 song by Halestorm

== Other uses ==
- Love Bites, a novel in the Vampire Kisses series by Ellen Schreiber

== See also ==
- "Love-Bheits", an episode of the TV series The Venture Bros
- Love Bytes, an Australian TV anthology series
- Lovebytes, a digital arts organisation based in Sheffield, UK
