= Batallion 50 Rock the Hebron Casbah =

2010 viral video

"Batallion 50 Rock the Hebron Casbah" is a viral amateur dance video in the flash mob style produced by soldiers in the Israel Defense Forces (IDF).

The video was filmed in 2010 by soldiers serving in the IDF's Nahal Brigade. It was viewed more than 1.6 million times online in the first few days after being uploaded to YouTube.

== Video ==
The video opens with six infantry soldiers from the Hod platoon of the Nahal Brigade's 50th Airborne Battalion on foot patrol. They are in a two-by-three formation in Hebron in the West Bank, a tense flash point of attacks on Israeli soldiers. The soldiers are walking cautiously down a deserted Jabel Rahma Street, near the Tel Rumeida site, in the Jewish section of Hebron, armed and in full combat gear, including bullet-proof vests. The Muslim call to prayer can be heard coming from the loudspeaker of a mosque (all the sound in the video was edited in after the footage was shot).

Suddenly, the voice of American electropop singer Ke$ha breaks in. She is singing her hit # 1 pop song Tik Tok: "Tonight I'ma fight, Til' we see the sunlight, Tick tock on the clock but the party don't stop, no".

With the music, the soldiers abruptly break into choreographed dance moves. The soldiers perform synchronized dance steps singly and in pairs. The soldiers suddenly stop dancing and continue their patrol.

The Israeli newspaper Yediot Aharonot reported that some Palestinian natives of Hebron told reporters that the music the soldiers danced to woke them up at dawn, but the video was actually filmed at 7 p.m., in the half-light not of dawn but of evening. It was filmed without music, a commander calling out the dance moves. The music was edited in later. And that it was shot in an area considered free from strife.

The 106-second amateur video was praised for its artistry in "juxtaposing tension and cathartic dance." According to The Jerusalem Post columnist Liat Collins, "television stations in countries including Britain, Belgium, Australia, New Zealand, the US, India, and Brazil couldn’t resist the temptation to show the clip, and at least one broadcaster declared the soldiers "cute".

== Other videos ==
The video is a spoof of a comedy skit from Eretz Nehederet, an Israeli TV show. In that skit, two shop girls force their customers to fold clothes in time to music.

The IDF video also followed several videos posted by soldiers in other armies. They include one showing American soldiers in Afghanistan dancing to Telephone by Lady Gaga, which has been viewed online over five million times. A video of British soldiers and officers in Iraq going about their routine to Madness’s Must Be Love is another example. In another video, U.S. Marines in Iraq dance and lip-sync to Haddaway’s What Is Love? . In 2013, a video emerged showing Syrian Army soldiers in the battlefield dancing to Usher's hit Yeah!.

Israeli soldiers have produced and posted numerous comedy videos, in addition to several videos of Israeli soldiers in uniform dancing and singing. The lighthearted genre includes video of uniformed tank mechanics "busting a move" on a sidewalk, in which three soldiers lip sync to The Tokens' recording of The Lion Sleeps Tonight, and another in which a group of Israeli female soldiers dance to Avril Lavigne singing Girlfriend.

== Controversy ==
The IDF released a statement which read: "This was a joke by the soldiers, and the matter is currently being investigated by the battalion commanders."

The video received numerous reactions in the world media, most of them humorous. British news anchors laughed, and the Telegraph newspaper lauded the "baddest dudes and grooviest chicks" of the IDF. The Irish Independent called the choreography "brilliant".

The Hong Kong newspaper The Standard said that the soldiers had undertaken some "daring maneuvers" which "appeared to indicate they had undergone some sort of special training". France 24 opined that the soldiers may have to "face the music".

Haaretz reported that the soldiers faced possible disciplinary action. Agence France-Presse reported that the soldiers were likely to be "punished" for "inappropriate conduct during a military operation."

The soldier who uploaded the video removed it from YouTube. But it had already spread across the Web, and was quickly reposted on YouTube, Facebook and other web sites. Political science professor Gerald M. Steinberg commented: "We're talking about 18- or 19-year-old kids in an unimaginably stressful environment. They are trying to lighten up."

There were calls by some for the soldiers to be punished harshly on the grounds that the video hurts the IDF's image. But others called it a "funny" sketch made by 18-year-old youths. According to reporter Dominic Waghorn of Sky News, official reaction to similar IDF videos in the past had "ranged from a threat of disciplinary action to a shrug. Military life can be boring, they've got phones, they listen to music."

The two sergeants who were the squad commanders of the patrol were ordered to participate in an IDF educational military film. Their educational video is to be screened in IDF units. The other soldiers were on vacation leave, as they were scheduled to leave the service within the next few days.
