= Grab It! =

Studio album by L'Trimm
- Released: 1988
- Genre: Hip hop
- Label: Time-X/Atlantic
- Producer: Larry Davis

L'Trimm chronology
Grab It! (1988)	Drop That Bottom (1989)

Grab It! is the debut album by the American hip hop duo L'Trimm, released in 1988. It was originally released by Time-X Records before being licensed to Atlantic Records.

The album peaked at No. 132 on the Billboard 200. "Cars with the Boom" (also known as "Cars That Go Boom") peaked at No. 54 on the Billboard Hot 100.

== Production ==
The album was produced by Larry Davis, for Paul Klein's Hot Productions. The tracks were constructed around synthesizers and 808 drums, per the Miami bass sound.

"Grab It" was written as a cheeky answer record to Salt-N-Pepa's "Push It".

== Critical reception ==
Professional ratings
Review scores
Source	Rating
AllMusic	4/5 stars
The Encyclopedia of Popular Music	3/5 stars
The Rolling Stone Album Guide	3.5/5 stars

The Los Angeles Times wrote of "Cars With The Boom": "One of the dumber rap songs to come down the pike lately, this ode to noise pollution is also the most irresistible." The Morning Call listed the album among the ten worst of 1988, writing that the duo "may single-handedly erase all the musical respect more serious rappers have earned."

AllMusic called the album "silly, goofy, escapist fun," writing that the "very pop-minded, club-oriented songs are infectious and entertaining despite the group's obvious limitations." Praising "Cars with the Boom", Miami New Times wrote that "the fact stands, there's something almost benign and cute about this affair ... [L'Trimm's] delivery, and it's all based on their delivery, is fun and childish." The Rolling Stone Album Guide thought that "the giggly good nature of the duo's delivery keeps these raps from sounding like mere sexploitation." Writing of "Cars with the Boom"'s 2020 reemergence via TikTok, The Washington Post declared that "the song stands out in the landscape of hip-hop for being so unapologetically light." Calling L'Trimm "the female equivalent of the mighty Tone Loc," the Chicago Sun-Times also chose "Cars with the Boom" as the duo's "finest" song.

== Track listing ==
No.	Title	Length
1.	"Grab It"	4:38
2.	"Better Yet L'Trimm"	4:30
3.	"We Can Rock the Beat"	3:26
4.	"Sexy"	4:37
5.	"Cuttie Pie"	4:18
6.	"He's a Mutt"	4:02
7.	"Don't Come to My House"	4:25
8.	"Cars with the Boom"	3:53

== Personnel ==
- Lady Tigra – vocals
- Bunny D – vocals
