= The Clik Clik =

British musical group

- Origin: Fulham, London
- Genres: Indie; hip hop; electro
- Years active: 2007–2008
- Label: Friends vs Records
- Members: Stefan Abingdon; Maya Yianni; Henry Bauckham; Dru Wakely
- Website: myspace.com/theclikclik

The Clik Clik were a British band known for releasing a series of songs that became critically acclaimed for being a 'contagious blend of ‘wonky pop’, indie, hip-hop and electro'. The band, originally a duo of Abingdon and Yianni, toured with bands such as Hadouken! while headlining festivals such as Ibiza Rocks and received regular airtime on British indie music radio stations.

== History ==
The Clik Clik formed in 2007 as a duo of Stefan Abingdon (guitar & vocals) and Maya Yianni (keyboard & vocals). They received much airtime and 'destroyed dance floors from Barnsley to Brighton' with their debut single My Dunks, a song about a man who cares too much for his Nike shoes, written after Abingdon witnessed 'a kid on the way to school lavishing the sort of care and attention on his Nikes normally reserved for pets'. In 2008 supporting musicians from the single officially joined the band, with Henry Bauckham (bass) and Dru Wakely (drums) becoming additional members. A follow-up single, Did You Wrong, was also released to positive reception. The single was released on 7" vinyl, backed with a remix by popular British musician Frankmusik. Following a break in music release, the band released a statement in late 2008 announcing their split. Since then, Abingdon and Wakely have had success with their comedy band The Midnight Beast, with Yianni recording and releasing solo music to support her live acts under the name 'Little Liar'.

== Discography ==
=== Singles ===
Year	Single details
2007	My Dunks: Released: 17 December 2007; Label: Friends vs Records; Format: 7" single, digital download
2008	Did You Wrong: Released: June 2008; Label: Friends vs Records; Format: 7" single, digital download
