= Booty Call (EP) =

Booty Call EP

EP by The Midnight Beast
- Released: 13 September 2010
- Recorded: 2010
- Genre: Comedy, pop
- Length: 11:50
- Label: Midnight Beast Records; AWAL Records
- Producer: Stefan Abingdon; Andrew Wakely; Ashley Horne

The Midnight Beast EP chronology
| Booty Call EP (2010) | Love Bites (2013) |

Booty Call is the Midnight Beast's debut EP released in 2010.

== Background and videos ==
The EP was released in 2010, the same years as each of the videos for the songs. The song "Booty Call" is about when the three members of the band, Stefan, Dru and Ash, have a sleepover at Stef's house. They involve themselves in various activities such as doing their hair, playing My Little Pony and watching movies. The song "Daddy" tells the story of Dru's past, when his father left him for their family's Spanish cleaner. It also shows how Dru reacts to this, which involves him eating excessively. "Fashion Innit" is a skit about the Band learning about fashion. The video for "Daddy" was uploaded to YouTube on 24 June 2010. The Booty Call video was uploaded on 12 August 2010 and has since had over 4,000,000 views. The video for Fashion Innit featured Stefan receiving a call from Zane Lowe, asking them to do a "Gonzo Report" on fashion. The song then commences, and at the end they decide to decline the offer. Track 2 on the EP is a clean version of Booty Call.

== Track listing ==
| No. | Title | Writer(s) | Length |
|---|---|---|---|
| 1. | "Booty Call (A Bit Rude)" | The Midnight Beast | 3:36 |
| 2. | "Booty Call" (Clean version) | The Midnight Beast | 3:13 |
| 3. | "Daddy" | The Midnight Beast | 3:07 |
| 4. | "Fashion Innit" | The Midnight Beast | 1:54 |

== Charts ==
| Chart (2010) | Peak position |
|---|---|
| UK Singles Chart | 64 |
