= Shtick Heads =

Studio album by The Midnight Beast
- Released: 2 June 2014
- Genre: Comedy
- Label: Sounds Like Good
- Producer: The Midnight Beast

The Midnight Beast chronology
Love Bites EP (2013)	Shtick Heads (2014)

Shtick Heads is the second album released by British comedy band The Midnight Beast. The album and its artwork were announced in January 2014 on the band's website, followed by the track listing the next day. The album was released via CD and digital download.

== Track listing ==
No.	Title	Writer(s)	Length
1.	"Beast Song Ever"	Abingdon/Horne/Wakely	1:43
2.	"Sweet Sixteen"	Abingdon/Gluck/Gold/Gottlieb/Horne/Wakely/Wiener	3:22
3.	"Pointless Skit 1"	Abingdon/Horne/Wakely	0:57
4.	"The Main One"	Abingdon/Horne/Wakely	3:03
5.	"When I'm Older"	Abingdon/Horne/Wakely	2:58
6.	"Friends for Never"	Abingdon/Horne/Wakely	3:33
7.	"Pointless Skit 2"	Abingdon/Horne/Wakely	1:17
8.	"Plenty More Fish"	Abingdon/Horne/Wakely	2:15
9.	"#Holiday"	Abingdon/Bennett/Horne/Wakely/Welch	3:09
10.	"Balls so Hard"	Abingdon/Horne/Wakely	2:19
11.	"Bass Face"	Abingdon/Horne/Wakely	2:37
12.	"Pointless Skit 3"	Abingdon/Horne/Wakely	1:04
13.	"Five a Day Flex"	Abingdon/Horne/Wakely	2:07
14.	"Sextape"	Abingdon/Horne/Wakely	2:58
15.	"Love Bites"	Abingdon/Horne/Wakely	2:34
16.	"ÜBERCVRRNT (SWAGGERLICIOUSYOLOHELLADOPENESS)" (Hidden Bonus Track)	Abingdon/Horne/Wakely	11:37

== Personnel ==
=== The Midnight Beast ===
- Stefan James Donald John Abingdon — vocals, guitar, keyboards, songwriting
- Ashley Neil Horne — vocals, bass, guitar, songwriting
- Andrew Francis Wakely — vocals, drums, songwriting

=== Additional personnel ===
- Derek "Sway" Safo — additional vocals on "Sweet Sixteen"
- Melanie Martinez — additional vocals on "Sweet Sixteen"
- Nova Rockafeller — additional vocals on "#Holiday"
- Harry "Cliff Richard" Webb — additional vocals on "#Holiday"
- Reginald "Reggie" Watts — additional vocals on "Bass Face"
- Sexual P — additional vocals on "Five a Day Flex"
- The Hell — additional vocals on "ÜBERCVRRNT (SWAGGERLICIOUSYOLOHELLADOPENESS)"

== Charts ==
Chart (2014)	Peak position
UK Albums Top 100	74
