= Sophie Wu =

British actress (born 1983)

- Born: 23 December 1983 (age 42); Edinburgh, Scotland
- Education: London Academy of Music and Dramatic Art
- Occupation: Actress
- Years active: 2006–present
- Children: 2

Sophie Wu (born 23 December 1983) is a Scottish actress. Her films include Kick-Ass (2010). On television, she is known for her roles in the BBC Three drama The Fades (2011), the E4 sitcom The Midnight Beast (2012–2014), and the second and third series of the Channel 4 comedy-drama Fresh Meat (2012–2013).

== Life and career ==
Sophie Wu was born in Edinburgh to a Chinese father and a Scottish mother. She went to school in Scotland before studying at the London Academy of Music and Dramatic Art (LAMDA) between 2003 and 2006. After graduating, she began acting in television series, including Casualty and Hotel Babylon, before going on to have the supporting role of Kiki, in comedy film Wild Child opposite Emma Roberts, in 2008.

In 2010, Sophie's next film role came as the character of Erika Cho in the U.S. comic-book film adaptation Kick-Ass and 2013-sequel Kick-Ass 2. In 2011, she appeared in the BBC Three television series The Fades playing the role of Anne's friend, Jay. Later in 2012, she played the role of Stefan Abingdon's girlfriend, Zoe, in the sitcom The Midnight Beast, then she appeared in her second project with Kimberley Nixon, the second and third series of Fresh Meat, as recurring character, Heather.

Wu is also a writer. In 2014, she wrote and performed in a one-woman show, "Sophie Wu is Minging, She Looks Like She's Dead". She wrote a monologue for the BBC program The Break (2016–present). She wrote a play titled "Ramona Tells Jim", which premiered in 2017.

== Filmography ==
=== Film ===
Year	Title	Role	Notes
2008	Wild Child	Kiki	
2008	The Other Man	Shop Assistant	
2009	Man on a Motorcycle	Gallery Girl	Short film
2009	Because I Like You	Sophie	Short film
2009	Tormented	Mai Lee	
2010	Kick-Ass	Erika Cho	
2011	You Instead	Lucy	
2011	See Me	Rebecca	Short film
2013	Kick-Ass 2	Erika Cho	
2015	Ghost Fighting Corporation	Lucy	Short Film
2019	Automat	Susie	Short Film
2022	National Theatre Live: The Seagull	Masha	

=== Television ===
Year	Title	Role	Notes
2006	Casualty	Natalie Gayton	Episode: "Happy Hour"
2007	Sensitive Skin	Lucy	Episode: "Three Lost Loves"
2008	Hotel Babylon	Mei	Episode: "Episode 23"
2011	The Fades	Jay	Series regular
2011	Black Mirror	Jamie	Episode: "The National Anthem"
2012	The Midnight Beast	Zoe	
2012	Fresh Meat	Heather	Season two, recurring character
2013	Fresh Meat	Heather	Season three, recurring character
2015–2022	Horrible Histories	Empress Wu	3 episodes
2016	New Blood	Gemma	2 episodes
2018	The Break	Franny Wong	1 episode
2024	Here We Go	Zoe	1 episode

=== Video game ===
Year	Title	Role	Notes
2027	Squadron 42	Cara Webster	Motion capture
