= L'Trimm =

American hip hop duo

- Origin: Miami, Florida, United States
- Genres: Hip hop, rap, Miami bass
- Years active: 1985–1991
- Labels: Hot Productions; Atlantic Records, Time-X Records
- Members: Bunny D The Lady Tigra

L'Trimm was a Miami bass hip-hop duo composed of Bunny D and Lady Tigra. Originally from Coconut Grove, Florida (origin neighborhood of the City of Miami), they recorded three albums for Atlantic Records: Grab It! in 1988 (which is certified Gold by the RIAA), Drop That Bottom in 1989 (which led The Source to name the group Hip-Hop Goddesses of the Month), and Groovy in 1991.

== Group history ==
The group took its new name from a then-popular designer brand of blue jeans (Trim) and added the L' prefix to give it a French feel. The song "Grab It!" became a local hit and was followed by an album of the same name. Shortly after, "Cars with the Boom", an ode to subwoofers, reached number 54 on the Billboard Hot 100, and a national tour followed. Atlantic Records picked up the group's first album and signed a deal to distribute L'Trimm's second album, Drop That Bottom, which included a remix of "Grab It!" The album was only a minor success. Interest in "Cars with the Boom" was later renewed in mid-2020 due to the influence of TikTok.

L'Trimm became dissatisfied with the direction their music was taking once co-writers were put in charge of producing their third album, Groovy. At the same time, Miami indie labels began to speculate that the Miami bass sound would never break through to mainstream national audiences. As Hot Productions began to look for new creative inspiration, the group hired representation in the form of managers and lawyers. A stalemate was reached and the group abandoned the sessions of its third album, Groovy. With plenty of vocal outtakes left in the studio from previous sessions, Hot Productions continued creating the album without the artists' input. The resulting album had more of a house and new jack swing sound, which sold poorly, failed to find the new market for which it was aiming, and was poorly received by critics. Unwilling to compromise their creative input, unable to score another hit with the label's new sound, and with its youthful pop-rap style waning in popularity, L'Trimm disbanded.

== Life after L'Trimm ==
Bunny D became a nurse working in the fields of geriatrics, labor and delivery, and special needs children and adults. She has four children and was married to La Kidd from Philadelphia's Tuff Crew, whom she met while touring together. Tuff Crew released the 1989 hit "My Parta Town."

After a few years of hosting events in Miami's burgeoning music, arts, fashion, and club scenes in South Beach, Lady Tigra moved back to New York City, where she managed nightclubs. In 2008, she moved to Los Angeles and released her first solo project, Please Mr. Boombox (which featured a guest track by MC Lyte), to great critical review; this led to MySpace putting the first track on their sign-in page as video of the month. Tigra wrote and performed the jingle on the Pinkberry website and appeared on Nickelodeon children's show Yo Gabba Gabba!, where she performed Debbie Deb's "When I Hear Music." In 2010, she collaborated with writer/director J.B. Ghuhman Jr. and music producer Yeti Beats on the soundtrack of movie Spork, which incorporated many references to 1990s pop culture.

In 2016, Lady Tigra appeared in American documentary film 808. In 2018, Tigra appeared in the first episode of the second season of Peabody Award-winning Netflix docuseries Hip-Hop Evolution, "The Southern Way," alongside acts such as Uncle Luke, Disco Rick, Trick Daddy, Brother Marquis, Mr. Mixx, the Geto Boys, and UGK.

In 2019, Lady Tigra began a collaboration with Spencer Nezey (Her Majesty and the Wolves, Jupiter Rising) called Tigra & Spencer, releasing their first single, "Can't Walk Away," in December of the same year. Lady Tigra remains active in New York, Miami, and Los Angeles's underground music, fashion, DJ, art, and club scenes. Bunny guest appeared on the Tigra and SPNCR EP Black Rice in 2025. The single, "Guillotine," marked the return of the duo to the music scene.

In 2019, L'Trimm appeared in Boogaloo Shrimp documentary, a film about Michael Chambers, American dancer and actor known as "Boogaloo Shrimp." Chambers is most renowned for his role as "Turbo" in 1984 cult movie Breakin' and its sequel Breakin' 2: Electric Boogaloo.

In 2020, L'Trimm's song "Cars with the Boom" went viral on social media app TikTok. On June 3, compilation album Cars That Go Boom was released.

== Discography ==
=== Albums ===
- 1988: Grab It! (Time-X/Hot Productions HTLP-3307/Atlantic 81925) (Gold)
- 1989: Drop That Bottom (Atlantic 82026)
- 1991: Groovy (Atlantic 82300)
- 2020: Cars That Go Boom (Warner Music group - X5 Music Group)

The Lady Tigra

- 2008: "Please Mr. BoomBox" (High Score Productions)

=== Singles ===
L'Trimm:

- 1987: "Grab It"
- 1988: "Cutie Pie"
- 1988: "Cars with the Boom"
- 1989: "Drop That Bottom"
- 1991: "Get Loose"
- 1991: "Low Rider"

The Lady Tigra Singles:

- 2008: “Bass on the Bottom” (remixed by Mr. Hahn of Linkin Park)
- 2009: “Stole My Radio” (featuring Mc Lyte)
- 2010: “Santa Baby” (by Yeti Beats featuring DJ IQ Luna of The Handroids)
- 2011: “Summertime” (featuring Fatlip from The Pharcyde)
- 2012: “Thing-a-Ling” (Spork Movie Soundtrack)

Guest Appearances by The Lady Tigra:

- 2001: Larry Tee - “Supasize”
- 2004: Avenue D + Phiiliip - “Pants Down”
- 2006: The Phenomenal Handclap Band - "15 to 20" ft. The Lady Tigra
- 2009: Jupiter Rising - “When the Bass Drops”
- 2012: Staygold - “Backseat” (featuring Spank Rock, Damian Adore and Lady Tigra)
- 2015: Ruckus Robiticus - “Come Alive”
- 2017: Oliver - “Heart Attack” (featuring De La Soul)
