= Cars with the Boom =

1988 single by L'Trimm

Single by L'Trimm

from the album Grab It!
- B-side: "Don't Come to My House"
- Released: 1988
- Genre: Miami bass
- Length: 3:54
- Label: Time-X; Atlantic
- Songwriters: E. Cager; J. Stone; L. Julian; P. Klein; R. DeRougemont
- Producer: David Stone Klein

L'Trimm singles chronology
| "Cutie Pie" (1988) | "Cars with the Boom" (1988) | "Drop That Bottom" (1989) |

Music video
- "Cars with the Boom" on YouTube

"Cars with the Boom" (also titled "Cars That Go Boom") is a song by American hip hop duo L'Trimm, released in 1988 by Time-X and Atlantic as the third single from their debut studio album Grab It! (1988). The song was produced by David Stone Klein and is their most successful, peaking at number 54 on the US Billboard Hot 100 and number 39 on the Billboard Hot R&B/Hip-Hop Songs chart.

== Composition ==
"Cars with the Boom" is a Miami bass song that features L'Trimm rapping about their love for men who have cars with exceptional subwoofers.

== Critical reception ==
Chris Willman of Los Angeles Times said of "Cars with the Boom": "One of the dumber rap songs to come down the pike lately, this ode to noise pollution is also the most irresistible." The Chicago Sun-Times regarded it as the duo's "finest" song. Abel Folgar of Miami New Times praised the song, writing that "the fact stands, there's something almost benign and cute about this affair ... [L'Trimm's] delivery, and it's all based on their delivery, is fun and childish". Travis M. Andrews of The Washington Post declared that "the song stands out in the landscape of hip-hop for being so unapologetically light".

"Cars with the Boom" was ranked number 95 on VH1's "100 Greatest Songs of Hip Hop" in 2008 and number 100 on Rolling Stone's "Top 100 Hip Hop Songs of All Time" in 2017. It was also ranked number ten in Complex's "The 50 Best Miami Rap Songs" in 2011, number 141 in Rolling Stone's "200 Greatest Dance Songs of All Time" in 2022, and in 2024, Miami New Times included it in their list of the "10 Greatest Miami Bass Songs of All Time".

== Other versions ==
American rapper Brianna Perry released a remake of "Cars That Go Boom", simply titled as "Cars".

== TikTok virality ==
The song renewed popularity in mid-2020 due to widespread use in dancing and lip-syncing trends on the video-sharing app TikTok.

== Charts ==
| Chart (1988) | Peak position |
|---|---|
| US Billboard Hot 100 | 54 |
| US Hot R&B/Hip-Hop Songs (Billboard) | 39 |
