= The Midnight Beast (TV series) =

- Season 1 DVD cover
- Written by: Andrew Ellard; Tom Edge; Ben Gregor; Jason Hazeley; Joel Morris; Stefan Abingdon; Dru Wakely; Ashley Horne
- Directed by: Ben Gregor
- Starring: Stefan Abingdon; Dru Wakely; Ashley Horne
- Country of origin: United Kingdom
- Original language: English
- No. of series: 2
- No. of episodes: 12

Production
- Producers: Mary Burke; Robin Gutch; Alex Marshall; Cathy Mason; Rachel Mason; Dean O'Toole
- Editors: Adam Dolniak; Andy Hague
- Running time: 25 minutes

Original release
- Network: E4
- Release: 6 July 2012 – 27 February 2014

Related
- The Inbetweeners

The Midnight Beast is a British sitcom that was released by the UK comedy band The Midnight Beast in 2012. The show had been in production for almost a year before release and featured most of the songs from the band's debut album. It was announced on The Midnight Beast's YouTube channel that the show has been renewed for a second and final series.

== Story ==
The show follows the lives of the band as they try to become better musicians. They live in a rubbish flat and are almost broke. Their creepy neighbour Sloman (played by Simon Farnaby) is often trying to impress them or join them in various events. The band has not achieved anything yet; they are broke and starving. Their manager, Chevy (played by Ryan Pope) is not much help, as he is a drug addict and only interested in them to make money for drugs. Stefan's girlfriend Zoe (played by Sophie Wu) also appears in all six episodes. They come across various problems, such as an eccentric artist making a disgusting music video of them, Dru spending too much time playing games and selling themselves to a bad and controlling record label.

The second season follows the boys as they finally get a proper job as cleaners at a run-down ex-Bingo Hall. They are asked to do additional task by employer Sylvia (Julia Deakin) to ensure they keep their jobs as they continually make mistakes and anger customers. They also enter competitions regularly in an effort to improve their financial state. The band also temporarily splits, as Ash leaves to pursue a solo career, but re-joins the band following his rise to success, only to be discovered as a fraud as he "doesn't actually release any music". Their past and the creation of the band is also revealed during a flashback when returning to their old school together. The final episode of the season involves the band entering in a pub quiz to try and win enough money to pay off their employer's gambling debt. It is revealed that all the entrants are cheating, and it is up to them to avoid being caught by quiz-master Sloman to cheat their way to victory.

== Release ==
The show was first aired in the UK on the channel E4 in 2012. One episode was released each week over a six-week period. After each episode, you could buy the soundtrack in the form of a Single on iTunes. The lead up to the first episode featured a live performance by the band, and a tweet of #UnleashTheBeast going up on Twitter and a Live Q&A on YouTube. The first episode of the show was premiered in Australia on the channel SBS2 on 22 April 2013. The DVD of the first season is for sale (in Region 2 format) on Amazon.

== Main cast ==
Character	Cast member	Appearances
Stef	Stefan Abingdon	12 episodes, 2012–2014
Ash	Ashley Horne	12 episodes, 2012–2014
Dru	Dru Wakely	12 episodes, 2012–2014
Sloman	Simon Farnaby	10 episodes, 2012–2014
Zoe	Sophie Wu	7 episodes, 2012–2014
Chevy	Ryan Pope	6 episodes, 2012
Hope	Ria Zmitrowicz	5 episodes, 2014
Ronnie	Esther Smith	4 episodes, 2014
Sylvia	Julia Deakin	3 episodes, 2014
Bogdan	Mihai Arsene	3 episodes, 2014

== Episodes ==
Series One
#	Air date	Episode	Plot	Track listing
1	6 July 2012	"Someone Called Sam"	The Midnight Beast are a young, potty-mouthed band trying to make it big in the music industry. The band move into a high-rise dump in East London, where they scam free pizzas and eat cat food to stay alive. Their geeky neighbour Sloman is suspicious of his new neighbours but soon finds common ground over his love of their music. Led into chaos by their manager Chevy, the band attempt to set up a gig in a trendy club only to be kicked out for stealing drinks and lemons to stave off scurvy. With the help of Stef's sassy and streetwise girlfriend Zoe, the band manage to put on a successful gig in their flat and make some money to pay for beer.	I Kicked a Shark in the Face; Ninjas; Begging
2	13 July 2012	"Father's Day"	Stef stays up all night editing a rubbish animated video for the band's new track Booty Call. And Dru miraculously receives a maintenance cheque from his long-estranged dad. But when Ash unplugs the computer to make space for his video game, the entire music video is lost. Dru offers up his father's 'dirty money' to make a new video to be directed by art world icon Falco, played by Gerald Kyd. But the band soon realise it may be better to keep creative control...	Medium Pimpin; Daddy; Booty Call
3	20 July 2012	"Hardcore"	When the Beast's manager Chevy finally gets them a gig on a TV show, the boys are hit by a crisis of confidence after bumping into a mouthy hardcore band who are also appearing. They decide to try to change their image to compete, but discover that they should have had more faith in their own quirky style, as it might have avoided them being thrown off live TV when their performance doesn't quite go to plan...	Quirky; Censorshit; Strategy Wanking
4	27 July 2012	"Hey Ladies"	The Midnight Beast are at crisis point... Dru has become hypnotised by his war-themed video games and Ash is being led around by the lump in his pants, leaving Stef to keep the band together. In an emergency intervention, their manager Chevy bans Dru from video games and urges him to get a girlfriend. Ash is forbidden from touching any girl until the band's problems are solved. Meanwhile, a wild-eyed obsessive girl called Frog, played by Hannah Tointon, falls head over heels for Dru, much to the horror of his flatmates.	Videogames; Life Is a Musical
5	3 August 2012	"Boyband"	The Midnight Beast have had enough of their budget starving-artist lifestyle. Chevy is just not cutting the mustard as their manager any more. The guys want money and fame, and they want it now. Unbeknown to the band, Dru takes matters into his own hands and makes a devil's pact with major label boss Jay Chitole, played by Patrick Baladi. Will the group trade in their independence for sexy motorbikes and intergalactic superstardom and become just another boyband?	J£nny: Ready to Blow; Lez Be Friends; Just Another Boyband
6	10 August 2012	"The Sloman Show"	Sloman breaks into the band's flat after a massive party and sets up a makeshift studio in their front room, where he broadcasts all their secrets and videos.	I Kicked a Shark in the Face; Videogames; Life Is a Musical; Lez Be Friends
Series Two
1	23 January 2014	"The Twilight Beast"	Stef, Dru and Ash get a job in a local ex-bingo hall run by fearsome East End granny Sylvia and her granddaughters Ronnie and Hope. Their first task is to put on a birthday party for 16-year-old Hope and her friends, but Stef is reeling from discovering that his girlfriend Zoe is now his ex-girlfriend and is going out with chart-topping rapper Sexual P, played by Jazzie Zonzolo. While Stef works on his own crazy idea for the party, Ash and Dru decide on a Twilight theme. But when everyone turns up for the party, it's not exactly what they had hoped for.	I Swear; Black Guy; 5-a-Day Flex
2	30 January 2014	"Fight or Flight"	The guys are skint, in spite of their new job at the bingo hall. Having entered a bunch of competitions, all they've won so far is a packet of Femidoms. They are now pinning their hopes on the local Birdman competition, but preparation is delayed while they help their neighbour Sloman come up with a convincing plan to win back his wife, played by Sofia Hayat, who wants a divorce. Dru trains Sloman up for the big showdown, which sees Sloman take on his wife in the ring at the bingo hall. But will Sloman put up enough of a fight to win her back? And will the boys make it to the Birdman competition on time?	Plenty More Fish; Übercurrent
3	6 February 2014	"Beast Holiday Ever"	The guys have saved up enough money to go on holiday. They're all set to go until Stef discovers that Ash has changed all of their passport photos for selfies. In light of this, they have to set their sights closer to home and end up camping under a holiday billboard in a local car park. But will the boys survive the week without killing each other?	Holiday; When I'm Older
4	13 February 2014	"Going Solo"	The band play a lesbian wedding gig at the bingo hall, but Ash's decision to perform their hit song Lez Be Friends doesn't go down well and a huge row erupts that results in Ash going solo. Taking advice from Sloman on how to be a rock star, he launches his new look and new guitar on an Open Mic night at a local hipster bar. The problem is, he doesn't have a song and can't play the guitar. Meanwhile, Stef and Dru fail to recruit a new band member, so they both end up going solo too. Will they all survive on their own or are The Midnight Beast ultimately destined to be together?	The Main One; Friends for Never
5	20 February 2014	"They Came Upon a Midnight Beast"	The guys have been invited back to their old school for Careers Day. Hope from the bingo hall stumbles across them, and finds out that the former students became friends over the production of the school Nativity. Flashback to the boys' school days where it's Stef's first directing gig, and he has to choose between three options: a traditional Nativity to please the headmaster, played by Rupert Vansittart, a Star Wars-based show to please school geek Jason, and a feminist piece to please the school's most attractive girl, Alaska, played by Chloe-May Cuthill, who Ash has the hots for.	Follow That Star: Mary; You've Got Options; Just a Boy; Zero A.D.
6	27 February 2014	"Quiz Night Beast"	Just as the Midnight Beast are finally settled into their new jobs at the bingo hall, owner Sylvia declares that she can't pay the rent and she desperately needs to raise some money or she'll lose the hall. Dru comes up with the brilliant idea of a high-stakes pub quiz, with a £5000 prize. Sloman is the quiz master and presides over five teams who are fighting it out. It soon becomes apparent that each team has its own very hidden agenda... The whole event goes completely Usual Suspects, but will the boys manage to win the quiz and save the bingo hall?	Sweet Sixteen (featuring Derek 'Sway' Safo)
