= Love Bites (EP) =

EP by The Midnight Beast
- Released: 14 February 2013
- Genre: Comedy
- Length: 11:29
- Label: Sounds Like Good

The Midnight Beast EP chronology
Booty Call (2012)	Love Bites (2013)	Self-Deprecation Nation (2015)

Love Bites is the second EP by the UK-based comedy band The Midnight Beast which was released on 14 February 2013.

== Announcement and release ==
The song was first announced by the band on The Midnight Beast website on 1 February 2013. Along with the announcement, it was also stated the EP would feature exclusive remixes by Hadouken! and Drums N’ Kicks (feat. Mr E Nigma). There was a link to the trailer for the song. The song was released on Valentine's Day of 2013 to continue with the theme (although used in dark humor) of love.

== Video ==
On the same day the EP was released, the video for "Love Bites" (at 4 minutes and 32 seconds long) was uploaded to YouTube. The video features Abingdon talking about his new girlfriend (played by Kathryn Prescott) who is a zombie. He then takes her on a double date with Wakely and his girlfriend, which ends with Wakely saying "Stef I think it's obvious your girlfriend here is gay". The girl then proceeds to attack Wakely and his girlfriend and bites Abingdon, who turns into a Zombie. The video ends with the words "To be continued", and a snippet of an unreleased song.

== Track listing ==
No.	Title	Length
1.	"Love Bites"	2:34
2.	"Love Bites (Instrumental Version)"	2:33
3.	"Love Bites (Hadouken Remix)"	3:29
4.	"Love Bites (Drums n' Kicks Remix) [feat. Mr E Nigma]"	2:53
Total length:		11:29

== Notes ==
Track 3 and 4 are both remixes. One is by the band Hadouken!, who have toured with The Midnight Beast before. The second is done by Dru Wakely, under the name Drums n' Kicks
