= The Midnight Beast =

British comedy/parody music group

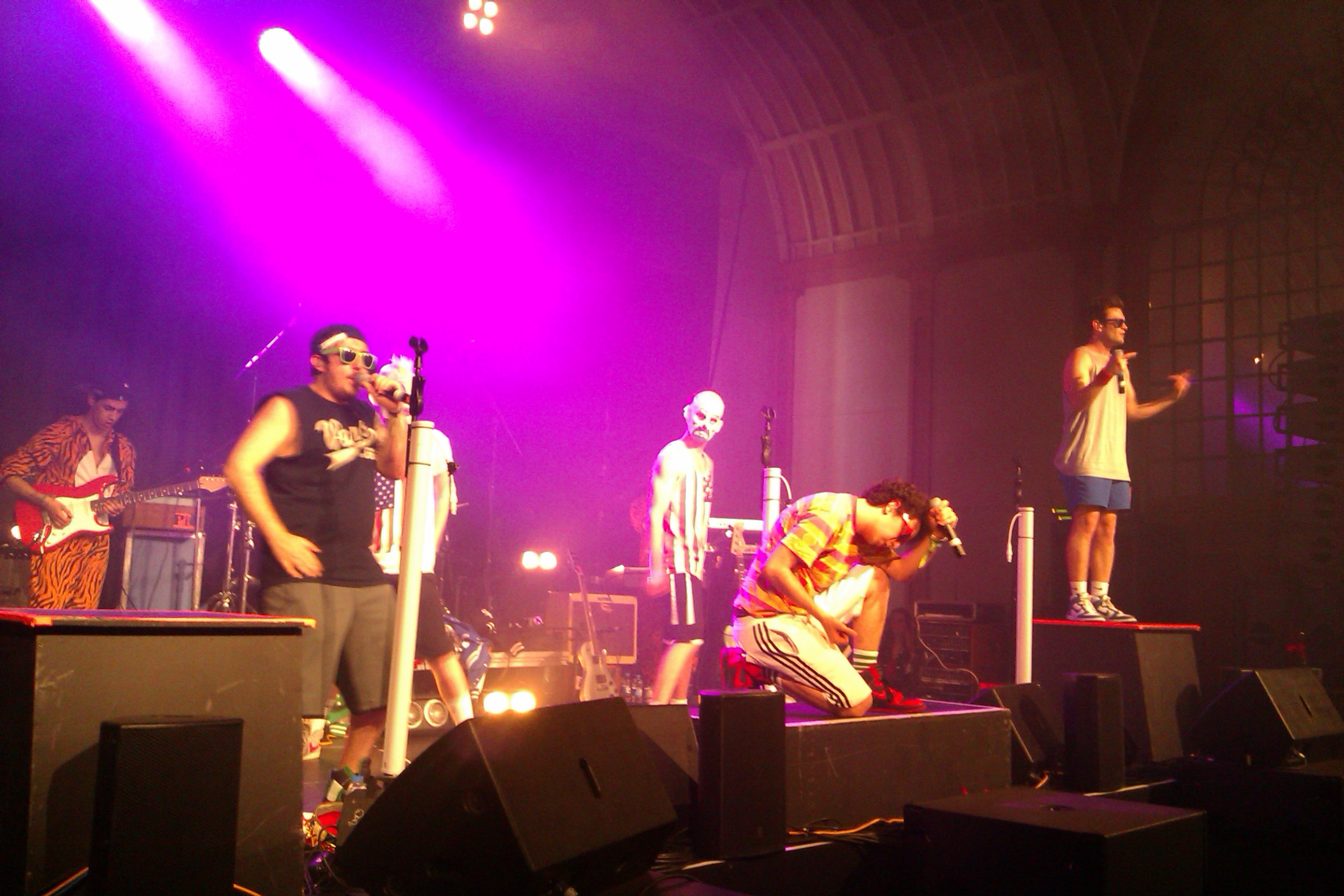
- The Midnight Beast live at the Brighton Corn Exchange (2013) (L-R) Dru Wakely, Stefan Abingdon, Ash Horne

Background information
- Origin: London, UK
- Genres: Pop rap; comedy; Comedy hip hop; indie pop
- Years active: 2009–present
- Labels: Sounds Like Good (created in March 2012)
- Members: Stefan Abingdon (vocals, guitar, piano); Dru Wakely (vocals, drums); Ashley Horne (vocals, bass)
- Website: www.themidnightbeast.com

The Midnight Beast, sometimes abbreviated as TMB, is a British comedy/parody music group from London. They are most famous for their YouTube cover-parody of the 2009 single "TiK ToK" by singer Kesha. The group currently has three members: Stefan Abingdon, Dru Wakely and Ashley Horne.

== Reception ==
The Midnight Beast had over 422,000 subscribers and 87,022,136 views combined on their YouTube channel (as of May 2021), as well as 405,650 Facebook fans as of March 2014. The group's songs often appear on iTunes music charts with their recent album reaching Number Two in the iTunes Music charts, and their accompanying music videos routinely reaching over 1 million views on YouTube. On Christmas Day 2009, the "TiK ToK" parody was featured on the front page of MTV.com. The group has also made videos in collaboration with BBC Comedy, MTV Rocks, Sky Arts, Vimeo Originals and Universal Pictures.

The group has garnered praise from many of the artists that they have parodied as both Ke$ha and Jay Sean have tweeted positive reactions to the parody of their respective songs, TiK ToK and Down, with Ke$ha stating "holy. shit. this is better than my version", and Jay Sean posting "Hahaha brilliant. Someone should mix this with 'pants on the ground.'"

The Midnight Beast has also attracted minor controversy with its music. In an online post from February 2011, Metro, a British newspaper, raised issue with the lyrics of "Use Ya Head", a sexual education-themed skit made for the Marie Stopes International charities Have A Larc organisation, which promotes safe sex. The paper cited the lines "One up the bum and it’s no harm done" and "One up the bum and you won’t be a mum'" stating that it appeared that the group was suggesting anal sex as a birth control method. It also quoted unnamed critics who mentioned that the video failed to point out that anal sex could still lead to the transmission of STIs.

Following the finale of season two of their series, the band released their second album Shtick Heads in June 2014. The album peaked at number 74 on the UK Albums Top 100 chart.

In 2018, the band released a new 'Claws' logo, that would serve as the artwork for their third album, "The Album Nobody Asked For." which was released on 24 August 2018, and the artwork for the album's five singles.

On April 4, 2019, the band re-released their parody of "TikTok" on the 10 year anniversary of the original release.

== Members ==
- Stefan James Donald John "Stef" Abingdon: Born 19 January 1989. He was born and grew up in Fulham, London with his parents (both of whom are musicians) and his two brothers, Kyle and Tcha. Abingdon learned piano from age six until he was asked to leave by his teacher because he did not practice enough. By age 12, Stefan was playing the guitar, and a week later he started his first band named Ink. His next band, called Icarus Burning, started when he was 12 with another boy, Simon Childs, and fellow founder Dru Wakely on drums. Years after, Stefan had started another band asking Maya Yianni (vocals) and Henry Bauckham (bass) to join. They went under the name, The Clik Clik; Dru joined at a later date after finishing college. After a few years the band called it a day and so Stefan and Dru started a new project which turned out to be called Perfect People. This was Stefan's final band before The Midnight Beast. As well as a songwriter he is now also the lead singer of the band Cast of Lions.
- Andrew Francis "Dru" Wakely: Born 10 January 1987. He grew up in Wandsworth, South-West London. It's unclear whether the story of his father running off with the family's Spanish cleaner on Christmas Eve (as told in the song "Daddy") is true. The story goes that the loss of his father led to a Calpol addiction and he described his teenage years as "a fine blend of drunken brawls, unsuccessful robbery attempts, and casual sex". He met Stefan Abingdon at a local drama group. Dru said he was interested in playing drums in Stefan's band (even though he had no experience). He auditioned to Abingdon on a wooden box they found in the street. His first band was known as Icarus Burning and was also a member of Perfect People and The Clik Clik. He was the second member of The Midnight Beast, as Ashley was not fully convinced to join until the last minute. As well as being in the Beast, Dru is a self-confessed 'HipHop head' and does his own songwriting and music production.
- Ashley Neil "Ash" Horne: Born 4 January 1989. He grew up in Reading with his mother and father. In his childhood, he enjoyed running around his garden and pretending to be Rambo. After a few years, his sister, Sarah Louise Horne, was born into the family. He has supported Newcastle United from childhood. At the age of 12, he started attending the Sylvia Young Theatre School. He was in Maths Mansion. After attending three years at the Italia Conti school, Ash got his first small acting part. He was part of a fake boy band in the Nickelodeon show Genie in the House. He was also "Ziggy" in EastEnders, and also got a part as "Lad" in the 2008 Christmas Special of Doctor Who with one line being "Who the hell is that?" Stef was telling Dru and Ash about a new song by Kesha called Tik Tok. He was going to parody it and needed a band. Ash was asked to be in the video because of his "retro – yet modern – style of dance." In the Tik Tok Parody, he did not have a singing part but was still part of the band. Recently Ash has appeared in All Stars the film and Skins Redux as the part of Stephen. He also claims that he is the "ladies man" of the band, although he has also been jokingly referred to as gay in songs by the band, such as Just Another Boyband, only to then deny it in their later single The Dance Routine.

== Book ==
The group released a semi-autobiographical book, titled Book at Us Now, on 27 October 2011. The book included interviews with the band members, the history of The Midnight Beast, as well as an explanation of the group's videos and songs. The group held book signings around the country in a promotion titled The Book at Us Now Tour.

== Sitcom ==
The band featured as itself in the self-titled sitcom The Midnight Beast, which aired on channel E4 in 2012. The series consists of 6 episodes, and details a fictionalised version of the band's members as they attempt to become successful musicians. The situation comedy also includes the actors and actress Simon Farnaby, Ryan Pope, and Sophie Wu. The show aired in Australia on 22 April 2013 on SBS2. They created series 2 which was broadcast on 23 January 2014 on E4. Following the finale of their second series, the band released The Unholy Trinity on iTunes featuring three songs from the series not released on the accompanying album.

== Discography ==
Studio albums

- The Midnight Beast (2012)
- Shtick Heads (2014)
- The Album Nobody Asked For. (2018)
