= Funhouse Tour: Live in Australia =

Live album

Live album by Pink
- Released: October 14, 2009
- Recorded: July 17–18, 2009
- Venue: Sydney Entertainment Centre, Sydney, Australia
- Genre: Pop rock
- Length: 155:00
- Label: LaFace; Jive
- Producer: P!nk

Pink chronology
Funhouse (2008)	Funhouse Tour: Live in Australia (2009)	Greatest Hits... So Far!!! (2010)

Professional ratings
Review scores
Source	Rating
AllMusic	3.5/5 stars
The Rolling Stone Album Guide	3/5 stars

Funhouse Tour: Live in Australia is a live album release by American pop singer Pink. It was released on DVD, Blu-ray and also as a separate live album audio version. The album contains the July 17 and 18, 2009 shows from the Funhouse Tour, recorded at the Sydney Entertainment Centre in Sydney, Australia. It was released on October 14, 2009, by LaFace Records. In Australia, the release has been certified 32× Platinum.

== Track listing ==
Track listing
No.	Title	Length
1.	"Highway to Hell (Intro)"	4:22
2.	"Bad Influence"	3:51
3.	"Just Like a Pill"	3:24
4.	"Who Knew"	3:42
5.	"Ave Mary A"	3:23
6.	"Don't Let Me Get Me"	4:10
7.	"I Touch Myself"	4:04
8.	"Please Don't Leave Me"	3:55
9.	"U + Ur Hand"	4:19
10.	"Leave Me Alone (I'm Lonely)"	3:31
11.	"So What"	6:18
12.	"Family Portrait"	7:09
13.	"I Don't Believe You"	6:38
14.	"Crystal Ball"	4:08
15.	"Trouble"	3:50
16.	"Babe I'm Gonna Leave You"	8:01
17.	"Sober"	5:42
18.	"Bohemian Rhapsody"	5:57
19.	"Funhouse"	3:35
20.	"Crazy"	8:21
21.	"Get the Party Started"	6:20
22.	"Glitter in the Air"	10:19

Bonus content
No.	Title	Length
23.	"It's All Your Fault"	3:54
24.	"One Foot Wrong"	3:13
25.	"On Tour with Pink"	27:32
26.	"How to Shred the Gnar"	4:08
27.	"Bloopers"	2:18

CD track listing
No.	Title	Length
1.	"Highway to Hell"	1:35
2.	"Bad Influence"	4:58
3.	"It's All Your Fault"	3:53
4.	"Ave Mary A"	3:24
5.	"Please Don't Leave Me"	3:50
6.	"U + Ur Hand"	4:14
7.	"I Don't Believe You"	4:23
8.	"Crystal Ball"	3:54
9.	"One Foot Wrong"	3:18
10.	"Babe I'm Gonna Leave You"	6:22
11.	"Bohemian Rhapsody"	5:51
12.	"Funhouse"	4:02
13.	"Push You Away"	3:01

== Musicians ==
- Paul Mirkovich - keyboards, backing vocals, musical director
- Justin Derrico - lead guitar
- Eva Gardner - bass guitar
- Kat Lucas - rhythm guitar, keyboards, backing vocals
- Stacy Campbell - backing vocals
- Jenny Douglas-McRae - backing vocals
- Mark Schulman - drums, cello

== Charts ==
=== DVD ===
The DVD became the fastest selling in Australian history debuting with sales in excess of 11 times platinum. For 19 consecutive weeks it has remained at number one on the ARIA DVD chart, and has been certified 31 times platinum.

Chart (2009)	Peak position
Australian DVD Chart	1
Belgium Ultratop DVD Chart	2
Dutch Megacharts DVD Chart	3
German DVD Chart	3
Hungarian DVD Chart	22
Swiss DVD Chart	1

=== CD ===
Chart (2009–12)	Provider	Peak position
Argentine Albums	CAPIF	11
Austria Albums Chart	Media Control	32
Belgium Albums Chart (Flanders)	Ultratop	51
Belgium Albums Chart (Walonnia)	Ultratop	96
Dutch Albums Chart	Megacharts	54
Hungarian Albums Chart	Mahasz	22

== Certifications ==
=== DVD ===
Region	Certification	Certified units/sales
Australia (ARIA)	32× Platinum	480,000^{^}
Germany (BVMI)	5× Gold	125,000^{^}
New Zealand (RMNZ)	Platinum	5,000^{^}
^{^} Shipments figures based on certification alone.
