= The Funhouse Summer Carnival Tour =

2010 concert tour by Pink

- European tour by Pink
- Associated album: Funhouse
- Start date: May 29, 2010
- End date: July 25, 2010
- Legs: 1
- No. of shows: 34
- Box office: $46.4 million

Pink concert chronology
- Funhouse Tour (2009); The Funhouse Summer Carnival Tour (2010); The Truth About Love Tour (2013–14)

The Funhouse Summer Carnival Tour was the fifth concert tour and first stadium tour by American recording artist Pink, launched in support of her fifth studio album Funhouse (2008). The Funhouse Summer Carnival and the Funhouse Tour (2009) sold a combined total 3 million tickets, and brought the tour to a final gross of $150 million. With the tour, Pink became the only female artist to sell out stadium shows in 2010 and the first solo female act to open the Wireless Festival in London, UK. Tor Nielson of Live Nation Sweden gave a statement calling Pink "Sweden's biggest stadium act" of 2010. The tour grossed more than $46.4 million from 30 shows.

== History ==
The tour was announced by tour promoter, Eventim, on October 14, 2009, followed by an announcement on Pink's official website in November. After selling over two million tickets on her successful Funhouse Tour, it was announced the Grammy Award-winning singer-songwriter will embark on her first ever stadium tour, in Europe. During an interview with online radio station, IN:DEMAND, Pink stated there will be a new setlist and less acrobatics, confirming that the tour isn't just a continuation of her previous tour. The tour was set to begin on May 27, 2010 at the Expo-Gelände in Hanover, Germany, however, the show was canceled for logistical reasons. In December, it was also confirmed that Pink would headline music festivals throughout Europe during the tour. Pink shot a new tour video for the tour in late April 2010. The video was shown while she was performing various songs. Butch Walker also duetted with Pink at most shows, including most festivals.

On July 15, 2010, during the show in Nürnberg, Germany, whilst performing "So What", Pink was not attached to her harness properly and fell, landing on the barricade. The song was immediately stopped, and the singer was rushed to the hospital. Later, she tweeted that she had neither broken bones nor serious injuries. The stunt was then temporarily removed from the show, until it returned on July 20, during the concert in Prague, Czech Republic, where Pink soared through the crowd in her harness successfully.

== Set list ==
The following set list is obtained from the May 29, 2010, show in Cologne, Germany. It is not intended to represent all dates throughout the tour.

1. "Get the Party Started"
2. "Funhouse"
3. "Ave Mary A"
4. "Who Knew"
5. "Bad Influence"
6. "Just Like a Pill"
7. "Please Don't Leave Me"
8. "Sober"
9. "I'm Not Dead"
10. "Unwind"
11. "Mean" (performed with Butch Walker)
12. "My Generation" / "Basket Case" / "Roxanne" (performed with Butch Walker)
13. "Whataya Want from Me"
14. "Try Too Hard"
15. "U + Ur Hand"
16. "Leave Me Alone (I'm Lonely)"

Encore

17. "So What"

Notes

- "Whataya Want from Me" was only performed in Cologne, Landgraaf, Heilbronn, Stadtallendorf, Munich, Berlin, and Ipswich.
- In Landgraaf, Pink performed Tom Petty's "Free Fallin'", in place of "Roxanne".
- Pink covered 4 Non Blondes' "What's Up" on select dates.
- Starting on June 2, "I Don't Believe You" and "Dear Mr. President" were added to the set list.
- During the concerts in Glasgow and Ipswich, "Just Like a Pill" and "Bad Influence" swapped places.
- In Arras, "Bad Influence", "Please Don't Leave Me", "Unwind", and "U + Ur Hand" were not performed.

== Tour dates ==
List of concerts, showing date, city, country, venue, and opening act
Date (2010)	City	Country	Venue
May 29	Cologne	Germany	RheinEnergieStadion
May 30 (Note: Part of Pinkpop Festival.)	Landgraaf	Netherlands	Megaland Landgaaf
June 2	Heilbronn	Germany	Frankenstadion
June 3 (Note: Part of Hessentag Festival.)	Stadtallendorf	Germany	Hessentagsarena Open Air Gelände
June 5	Innsbruck	Austria	Außenanlagen
June 6	Munich	Germany	Olympia Reitstadion Riem
June 8	Berlin	Germany	Waldbühne
June 11	Sunderland	England	Stadium of Light
June 12	Bolton	England	Reebok Stadium
June 13 (Note: Part of Isle of Wight Festival.)	Newport	England	Seaclose Park
June 16	Belfast	Ireland	King's Hall Complex Grounds
June 19	Dublin	Ireland	RDS Arena
June 20	Limerick	Ireland	Thomond Park
June 23	Swansea	Wales	Liberty Stadium
June 24	Coventry	England	Ricoh Arena
June 26	Glasgow	Scotland	Hampden Park
June 27	Alton	England	Alton Towers
June 29	Ipswich	England	Portman Road
July 2 (Note: Part of Wireless Festival.)	London	England	Hyde Park
July 3 (Note: Part of Rock Werchter.)	Werchter	Belgium	Werchter Festival Grounds
July 4 (Note: Part of Main Square Festival.)	Arras	France	Citadelle d'Arras
July 6 (Note: Part of Festival de Nîmes.)	Nîmes	France	Arena of Nîmes
July 8	Linz	Austria	Linzer Stadion
July 10	Bern	Switzerland	Stade de Suisse
July 12 (Note: Part of Moon and Stars Festival.)	Locarno	Switzerland	Piazza Grande
July 13	Nice	France	Stade Charles-Ehrmann
July 15	Nuremberg	Germany	EasyCredit-Stadion
July 16 (Note: Part of Salem Open Airs.)	Salem	Germany	Schule Schloss Salem
July 18 (Note: Part of Tuborg GreenFest.)	Saint Petersburg	Russia	Saint Petersburg TV Tower
July 20	Prague	Czech Republic	Synot Tip Arena
July 21	Helsinki	Finland	Kaisaniemi Park
July 23	Gothenburg	Sweden	Ullevi Stadium
July 24	Copenhagen	Denmark	Parken Stadium
July 25 (Note: Part of Odderøya Live.)	Kristiansand	Norway	Odderøya Amfi

== Personnel ==
- Lead vocals, aerobatics, dancing, acoustic guitar, executive producer, creator – P!nk
- Musical director, keyboards, vocals – Jason Chapman
- Drums, Cello – Mark Schulman
- Lead guitar – Justin Derrico
- Bass guitar – Eva Gardner
- Keyboards, rhythm guitar, vocals – Kat Lucas
- Vocals – Stacy Campbell
- Vocals – Jenny Douglas-Foote
- Dancing – Nikki Tuazon
- Dancing – Addie Yungmee
