= Greatest Hits... So Far!!! (Pink album) =

Greatest hits album by Pink
- Released: November 12, 2010
- Recorded: 2000–2010
- Genre: Pop rock
- Length: 59:29
- Labels: LaFace; Jive
- Producers: Tim Armstrong; Dallas Austin; Kevin "She'kspere" Briggs; Kandi Burruss; Danja; Dr. Luke; Jimmy Harry; Tony Kanal; Machopsycho; Billy Mann; Max Martin; Linda Perry; Shellback; Scott Storch; Butch Walker

Pink chronology
Funhouse Tour: Live in Australia (2009)	Greatest Hits... So Far!!! (2010)	The Truth About Love (2012)

Singles from Greatest Hits... So Far!!!
- 1. "Raise Your Glass" Released: October 5, 2010; 2. "Fuckin' Perfect" Released: December 14, 2010

Greatest Hits... So Far!!! is the first greatest hits album by American singer-songwriter Pink. It was released on November 12, 2010, by LaFace Records and Jive Records, in celebration of Pink's first decade on the music scene. The album features Pink's biggest hits from all her studio albums. Its track list differs depending on region, with four new tracks, only two of which are included on the North American edition.

The hit singles "Raise Your Glass" and "Fuckin' Perfect" peaked at number one and number two on the Hot 100 chart, respectively. In addition, "Heartbreak Down" achieved airplay success in some countries. This was the last material that Pink released under LaFace Records and is also her only album released under Jive Records before both labels were folded into RCA Records in late 2011. The compilation debuted at number 14 on the US Billboard 200 chart and advanced to number five during the holiday season due to the success of its singles, which raised Pink's total number of top-ten hits to eleven, and that of her number-one singles to three. The compilation's deluxe edition won the O Music Award for Best iTunes LP.

== Background ==
In September 2010, MTV Brazil stated that Pink would be releasing a greatest hits album in the fourth quarter of the same year. A few days later, it was reported by director Cole Walliser, who had worked with Pink on her Funhouse Carnival Tour advert, that he was shooting a new video with Pink. On September 15, Pink was spotted at a photoshoot in Los Angeles, and according to the photographer, the shoot was for her greatest hits compilation. The album is available in both standard and deluxe editions, with a British release occurring on November 15, and a US release occurring the day after. On October 5, the album was officially announced, along with its cover artwork.

Originally, Pink was against releasing a greatest hits compilation, stating that she "was not inspired at all for this album... I always figured you need to be 60 or better, to have a little more past, to put one of these out. I fought it for years." However, she changed her mind, realizing that "record companies can put out compilations without your permission" and concluded: "I wanted it done my way, so I jumped on board. Then, the less skeptical I felt about it, I started to feel a little proud."

== Singles ==
Professional ratings
Review scores
Source	Rating
AllMusic	4/5 stars
Christgau's Consumer Guide	A−
PopMatters	7/10
Sputnikmusic	4/5
Tom Hull – on the Web	A−

"Raise Your Glass" was released as the album's lead single in the first week of October. It was announced by Pink via her Twitter account and went on to top the charts in the United States and Australia. According to Pink, the song is dedicated to those who "felt they were not a part of the popular crowd". Its accompanying music video was directed by Dave Meyers, and celebrates same-sex marriage, animal rights and, as Pink puts it, "underdogs".

"Fuckin' Perfect" was released as the second single from the album. The song entered several charts before its official release as a single and reached number ten in Australia and number two in the United States. In the United Kingdom, the song was released in February 2011. It entered the UK singles chart at number 71 with the release of its host album and ultimately reached the top ten. The song's music video was filmed during an early stage of Pink's pregnancy, and features actress Tina Majorino, who plays the role of a troubled girl who ultimately becomes a famous artist.

"Heartbreak Down" was released as an airplay and promotional single only in central and eastern European countries in June 2011. The song peaked at number two on the Hungarian Airplay chart.

== Track listing ==
Greatest Hits... So Far!!! – North American and Canadian standard edition
No.	Title	Writer(s)	Length
1.	"Get the Party Started" (from Missundaztood, 2001)	Linda Perry	3:11
2.	"There You Go" (from Can't Take Me Home, 2000)	Pink; Kevin "She'kspere" Briggs; Kandi Burruss	3:26
3.	"Don't Let Me Get Me" (from Missundaztood)	Pink; Dallas Austin	3:31
4.	"Just Like a Pill" (from Missundaztood)	Pink; Austin	3:57
5.	"Family Portrait" (from Missundaztood)	Pink; Scott Storch	4:56
6.	"Trouble" (from Try This, 2003)	Pink; Tim Armstrong	3:12
7.	"Stupid Girls" (from I'm Not Dead, 2006)	Pink; Billy Mann; MachoPsycho	3:16
8.	"Who Knew" (from I'm Not Dead)	Pink; Max Martin; Lukasz Gottwald	3:28
9.	"U + Ur Hand" (from I'm Not Dead)	Pink; Martin; Gottwald; Rami Yacoub	3:34
10.	"Dear Mr. President" (feat. Indigo Girls) (from I'm Not Dead)	Pink; Mann	4:33
11.	"So What" (from Funhouse, 2008)	Pink; Martin; Shellback	3:35
12.	"Sober" (from Funhouse)	Pink; Nate Hills; Kara DioGuardi; Marcella Araica	4:11
13.	"Please Don't Leave Me" (from Funhouse)	Pink; Martin	3:51
14.	"Glitter in the Air" (from Funhouse)	Pink; Mann	3:47
15.	"Raise Your Glass" (previously unreleased)	Pink; Martin; Shellback	3:23
16.	"Fuckin' Perfect" (previously unreleased)	Pink; Martin; Shellback	3:30

Greatest Hits... So Far!!! – North American and Canadian iTunes Store bonus track
No.	Title	Writer(s)	Length
17.	"Heartbreak Down" (previously unreleased)	Pink; Butch Walker	3:18

Greatest Hits... So Far!!! – North American and Canadian deluxe edition (disc 1)
No.	Title	Writer(s)	Length
14.	"Funhouse" (from Funhouse)	Pink; Kanal; Harry	3:25
15.	"I Don't Believe You" (from Funhouse)	Pink; Martin	4:35
16.	"Glitter in the Air"	Pink; Mann	3:47
17.	"Raise Your Glass"	Pink; Martin; Shellback	3:23
18.	"Fuckin' Perfect"	Pink; Martin; Shellback	3:30

Greatest Hits... So Far!!! – North American and Canadian iTunes Store deluxe edition
No.	Title	Writer(s)	Length
19.	"Heartbreak Down"	Pink; Butch Walker	3:18

Greatest Hits... So Far!!! – International edition
No.	Title	Writer(s)	Producer(s)	Length
1.	"Get the Party Started"	Perry	Perry	3:11
2.	"There You Go"	Pink; Briggs; Burruss	Briggs; Burruss (vocal)	3:26
3.	"You Make Me Sick" (from Can't Take Me Home)	Brainz Dimilo; Anthony President; Mark Tabb	Babyface; Dimilo; President	4:06
4.	"Don't Let Me Get Me"	Pink; Austin	Austin	3:31
5.	"Just like a Pill"	Pink; Austin	Austin	3:57
6.	"Family Portrait"	Pink; Storch	Storch	4:56
7.	"Trouble"	Pink; Armstrong	Armstrong; Fields (add)	3:12
8.	"Stupid Girls"	Pink; Mann; MachoPsycho	Mann; MachoPsycho (co)	3:16
9.	"Who Knew"	Pink; Martin; Gottwald	Martin; Dr. Luke	3:28
10.	"U + Ur Hand"	Pink; Martin; Gottwald; Yacoub	Martin; Dr. Luke	3:34
11.	"Dear Mr. President" (featuring Indigo Girls)	Pink; Mann	Mann; Pink	4:33
12.	"So What"	Pink; Martin; Shellback	Martin	3:35
13.	"Sober"	Pink; Hills; DioGuardi; Araica	Danja; Kanal; Harry	4:11
14.	"Please Don't Leave Me"	Pink; Martin	Martin	3:51
15.	"Bad Influence" (from Funhouse)	Pink; Mann; Walker; MachoPsycho	Mann; Walker; MachoPsycho	3:35
16.	"Funhouse" (from Funhouse)	Pink; Kanal; Harry	Kanal; Harry	3:25
17.	"Raise Your Glass"	Pink; Martin; Shellback	Martin; Shellback	3:23
18.	"Fuckin' Perfect"	Pink; Martin; Shellback	Martin; Shellback	3:30
19.	"Heartbreak Down"	Pink; Walker	Walker	3:18
Total length:				77:31

Greatest Hits... So Far!!! – Australian, German, and streaming editions
No.	Title	Writer(s)	Producer(s)	Length
1.	"Get the Party Started"	Perry	Perry	3:11
2.	"There You Go"	Pink; Briggs; Burruss	Briggs; Burruss (vocal)	3:26
3.	"Don't Let Me Get Me"	Pink; Austin	Austin	3:31
4.	"Just like a Pill"	Pink; Austin	Austin	3:57
5.	"Family Portrait"	Pink; Storch	Storch	4:56
6.	"Trouble"	Pink; Armstrong	Armstrong; Fields (add)	3:12
7.	"Stupid Girls"	Pink; Mann; MachoPsycho	Mann; MachoPsycho (co)	3:16
8.	"Who Knew"	Pink; Martin; Gottwald	Martin; Dr. Luke	3:28
9.	"U + Ur Hand"	Pink; Martin; Gottwald; Yacoub	Martin; Dr. Luke	3:34
10.	"Dear Mr. President" (featuring Indigo Girls)	Pink; Mann	Mann; Pink	4:33
11.	"Leave Me Alone (I'm Lonely)" (from I'm Not Dead)	Pink; Walker	Walker	3:18
12.	"So What"	Pink; Martin; Shellback	Martin	3:35
13.	"Sober"	Pink; Hills; DioGuardi; Araica	Danja; Kanal; Harry	4:11
14.	"Please Don't Leave Me"	Pink; Martin	Martin	3:51
15.	"Bad Influence"	Pink; Mann; Walker; MachoPsycho	Mann; Walker; MachoPsycho	3:35
16.	"Funhouse"	Pink; Kanal; Harry	Kanal; Harry	3:25
17.	"I Don't Believe You"	Pink; Martin	Martin	4:35
18.	"Whataya Want from Me" (original demo recording)	Pink; Martin; Shellback	Martin; Shellback	3:46
19.	"Raise Your Glass"	Pink; Martin; Shellback	Martin; Shellback	3:23
20.	"Fuckin' Perfect"	Pink; Martin; Shellback	Martin; Shellback	3:30
21.	"Heartbreak Down"	Pink; Walker	Walker	3:18
Total length:				77:31

Greatest Hits... So Far!!! – iTunes Store bonus videos
No.	Title	Length
1.	"Leave Me Alone (I'm Lonely)" (The Funhouse Freak Show Version)
2.	"Please Don't Leave Me" (The Funhouse Freak Show Version)
3.	"Funhouse" (The Funhouse Freak Show Version)
4.	"Behind the Scenes of Greatest Hits... So Far!!!'s Photo Shoot"

Greatest Hits... So Far!!! 2019 – Japanese re-release
No.	Title	Writer(s)	Producer	Length
1.	"So What"	Pink; Martin; Shellback	Martin	3:35
2.	"Fuckin' Perfect"	Pink; Martin; Shellback	Martin; Shellback	3:30
3.	"Raise Your Glass"	Pink; Martin; Shellback	Martin; Shellback	3:23
4.	"Get the Party Started"	Perry	Perry	3:11
5.	"Who Knew"	Pink; Martin; Gottwald	Martin; Dr. Luke	3:28
6.	"Just like a Pill"	Pink; Austin	Austin	3:57
7.	"Sober"	Pink; Hills; DioGuardi; Araica	Danja; Kanal; Harry	4:11
8.	"U + Ur Hand"	Pink; Martin; Gottwald; Yacoub	Martin; Dr. Luke	3:34
9.	"Don't Let Me Get Me"	Pink; Austin	Austin	3:31
10.	"Stupid Girls"	Pink; Mann; MachoPsycho	Mann; MachoPsycho (co)	3:16
11.	"Please Don't Leave Me"	Pink; Martin	Martin	3:51
12.	"Funhouse"	Pink; Kanal; Harry	Kanal; Harry	3:25
13.	"Dear Mr. President" (featuring Indigo Girls)	Pink; Mann	Mann; Pink	4:33
14.	"Trouble"	Pink; Armstrong	Armstrong; Fields (add)	3:12
15.	"There You Go"	Pink; Briggs; Burruss	Briggs; Burruss (vocal)	3:26
16.	"Family Portrait"	Pink; Storch	Storch	4:56
17.	"Heartbreak Down"	Pink; Walker	Walker	3:18
18.	"Bad Influence"	Pink; Mann; Walker; MachoPsycho	Mann; Walker; MachoPsycho	3:35
19.	"You Make Me Sick"	Brainz Dimilo; Anthony President; Mark Tabb	Babyface; Dimilo; President	4:06
20.	"So What" (Bimbo Jones radio mix)	Pink; Martin; Shellback	Martin	3:36
Total length:				73:34

=== Deluxe edition bonus DVD ===
Greatest Hits... So Far!!! – North American and Canadian deluxe edition DVD
No.	Title	Album	Length
1.	"There You Go"	Can't Take Me Home
2.	"Most Girls"	Can't Take Me Home
3.	"Just like a Pill"	Missundaztood
4.	"Get the Party Started"	Missundaztood
5.	"Don't Let Me Get Me"	Missundaztood
6.	"Family Portrait"	Missundaztood
7.	"Stupid Girls"	I'm Not Dead
8.	"Who Knew"	I'm Not Dead
9.	"U + Ur Hand"	I'm Not Dead
10.	"Dear Mr. President" (from I'm Not Dead - Live Wembley Arena)	I'm Not Dead
11.	"So What"	Funhouse
12.	"Sober"	Funhouse
13.	"Please Don't Leave Me"	Funhouse
14.	"Funhouse"	Funhouse
15.	"I Don't Believe You"	Funhouse
16.	"Glitter in the Air" (from Funhouse - Live in Australia)	Funhouse
17.	"Leave Me Alone (I'm Lonely)" (The Funhouse Freak Show Version)	I'm Not Dead
18.	"Please Don't Leave Me" (The Funhouse Freak Show Version)	Funhouse
19.	"Funhouse" (The Funhouse Freak Show Version)	Funhouse
20.	"Behind the Scenes of Funhouse's Music Video"	Funhouse
21.	"Behind the Scenes of Greatest Hits... So Far!!!'s Photo Shoot"

Greatest Hits... So Far!!! – International deluxe edition DVD
No.	Title	Album	Length
1.	"There You Go"	Can't Take Me Home
2.	"Most Girls"	Can't Take Me Home
3.	"You Make Me Sick"	Can't Take Me Home
4.	"Get the Party Started"	Missundaztood
5.	"Don't Let Me Get Me"	Missundaztood
6.	"Just like a Pill"	Missundaztood
7.	"Family Portrait"	Missundaztood
8.	"Trouble"	Try This
9.	"God Is a DJ"	Try This
10.	"Last to Know"	Try This
11.	"Stupid Girls"	I'm Not Dead
12.	"Who Knew"	I'm Not Dead
13.	"U + Ur Hand"	I'm Not Dead
14.	"Nobody Knows"	I'm Not Dead
15.	"Dear Mr. President" (from I'm Not Dead - Live Wembley Arena)	I'm Not Dead
16.	"So What"	Funhouse
17.	"Please Don't Leave Me"	Funhouse
18.	"Sober"	Funhouse
19.	"Funhouse"	Funhouse
20.	"I Don't Believe You"	Funhouse
21.	"Bad Influence" (from Funhouse - Live in Australia)	Funhouse
22.	"Leave Me Alone (I'm Lonely)" (The Funhouse Freak Show Version)	I'm Not Dead
23.	"Please Don't Leave Me" (The Funhouse Freak Show Version)	Funhouse
24.	"Funhouse" (The Funhouse Freak Show Version)	Funhouse
25.	"Behind the Scenes of Funhouse's Music Video"	Funhouse
26.	"Behind the Scenes of Greatest Hits... So Far!!!'s Photo Shoot"

Greatest Hits... So Far!!! – Australian separate DVD release
No.	Title	Album	Length
27.	"Raise Your Glass"	Greatest Hits... So Far!!!
28.	"Fuckin' Perfect"	Greatest Hits... So Far!!!

== Charts ==
=== Weekly charts ===
Chart (2010–11)	Peak position
Australian Albums (ARIA)	1
Austrian Albums (Ö3 Austria)	4
Belgian Albums (Ultratop Flanders)	12
Belgian Albums (Ultratop Wallonia)	19
Canadian Albums (Billboard)	4
Croatian International Albums (HDU)	7
Danish Albums (Hitlisten)	5
Dutch Albums (Album Top 100)	3
Finnish Albums (Suomen virallinen lista)	16
French Albums (SNEP)	47
German Albums (Offizielle Top 100)	3
Greek Albums (IFPI)	2
Hungarian Albums (MAHASZ)	14
Irish Albums (IRMA)	8
Italian Albums (FIMI)	41
Japanese Albums (Oricon)	10
New Zealand Albums (RMNZ)	1
Norwegian Albums (VG-lista)	3
Polish Albums (ZPAV)	39
Portuguese Albums (AFP)	20
Scottish Albums (Official Charts)	4
Spanish Albums (Promusicae)	65
Swedish Albums (Sverigetopplistan)	8
Swiss Albums (Schweizer Hitparade)	4
UK Albums (Official Charts)	5
US Billboard 200	5
US Indie Store Album Sales (Billboard)	12

=== Year-end charts ===
Chart (2010)	Position
Australian Albums (ARIA)	1
Danish Albums (Hitlisten)	21
Dutch Albums (MegaCharts)	68
German Albums (Offizielle Top 100)	36
Hungarian Albums (MAHASZ)	51
New Zealand Albums (RMNZ)	12
Swedish Albums (Sverigetopplistan)	39
Swiss Albums (Schweizer Hitparade)	60
UK Albums (Official Charts)	32
Chart (2011)	Position
Australian Albums (ARIA)	12
Austrian Albums (Ö3 Austria)	63
Belgian Albums (Ultratop Flanders)	31
Belgian Albums (Ultratop Wallonia)	63
Canadian Albums (Billboard)	15
Danish Albums (Hitlisten)	33
Dutch Albums (MegaCharts)	34
German Albums (Offizielle Top 100)	83
New Zealand Albums (RMNZ)	18
Swedish Albums (Sverigetopplistan)	57
Swiss Albums (Schweizer Hitparade)	45
UK Albums (Official Charts)	45
US Billboard 200	22
Chart (2012)	Position
Australian Albums (ARIA)	42
UK Albums (OCC)	112
Chart (2013)	Position
Australian Albums (ARIA)	19
Chart (2014)	Position
Australian Albums (ARIA)	64
Chart (2018)	Position
Australian Albums (ARIA)	26
New Zealand Albums (RMNZ)	30
Chart (2019)	Position
Australian Albums (ARIA)	98
UK Albums (OCC)	75
Chart (2021)	Position
UK Albums (OCC)	91
Chart (2022)	Position
UK Albums (OCC)	97
Chart (2023)	Position
UK Albums (OCC)	65

=== Decade-end charts ===
Chart (2010–2019)	Position
Australian Albums (ARIA)	7
UK Albums (OCC)	38

== Certifications and sales ==
Region	Certification	Certified units/sales
Australia (ARIA)	11× Platinum	770,000^{‡}
Australia (ARIA) Stand alone DVD	2× Platinum	30,000^{^}
Austria (IFPI Austria)	Gold	10,000^{*}
Belgium (BRMA)	Gold	15,000^{*}
Brazil (Pro-Música Brasil)	Gold	20,000^{‡}
Canada (Music Canada)	2× Platinum	160,000^{^}
Czech Republic	—	10,000
Denmark (IFPI Danmark)	Platinum	30,000^{^}
France (SNEP)	Gold	50,000^{*}
Germany (BVMI)	5× Gold	500,000^{‡}
Hungary (MAHASZ)	Gold	3,000^{^}
Ireland (IRMA)	Platinum	15,000^{^}
New Zealand (RMNZ)	7× Platinum	105,000^{‡}
Sweden (GLF)	Gold	20,000^{‡}
Switzerland (IFPI Switzerland)	Gold	15,000^{^}
United Kingdom (BPI)	5× Platinum	1,500,000^{‡}
United States (RIAA)	Platinum	1,375,000
^{*} Sales figures based on certification alone.^{^} Shipments figures based on certification alone.^{‡} Sales+streaming figures based on certification alone.

== Release history ==
List of release dates, showing country, and record label
Region	Date	Label
Australia	November 12, 2010	Sony Music Australia
Germany	November 12, 2010	Sony Music Australia
United Kingdom	November 15, 2010	JIVE
United States	November 16, 2010	LaFace, JIVE
Brazil	December 21, 2010	Sony Music
Turkey	December 21, 2010	Sony Music
Japan	October 16, 2019	Sony Music Japan
