= Funhouse Tour =

2009 concert tour by Pink

- Tour by Pink
- Associated album: Funhouse
- Start date: February 24, 2009
- End date: December 20, 2009
- Legs: 4
- No. of shows: 151
- Box office: $100 million

Pink concert chronology
- I'm Not Dead Tour (2006–07); Funhouse Tour (2009); Funhouse Summer Carnival (2010)

The Funhouse Tour was the fourth concert tour by American singer-songwriter Pink. The tour supported her fifth studio album, Funhouse (2008). The tour visited Europe, Australia and North America. According to Pollstar, the Funhouse Tour (2009) earned more than $100 million with more than 1.5 million in attendance. The Australian leg of the tour broke the record for the biggest tour in the history of the country. The Australian shows were attended by 660,000 people and grossed over $55 million.

== Background ==
The tour was announced on October 14, 2008, nearly two weeks before the release of her fifth studio album. Pink stated, "I'm so excited to get back on the road. The 'Funhouse' tour ideas are running rampant in my head. Who knows what they'll come out as... And I can't wait to see." The tour followed her internationally successful I'm Not Dead Tour, which became one of the biggest tours in 2006 and 2007.

The tour also marked the first time Pink has headlined a North American arena tour. To describe the event, Pink stated, "I've waited 30 years for this tour. I really wasn't sure if anyone was going to show [up]."

== Synopsis ==
The concert starts with a video introduction which feature Pink watching TV. She then gets up and puts her lover's hand into a warm glass of water. She goes upstairs and gets changed into a white shirt and some jeans. She gets on a motorcycle and rides off, resembling her "Funhouse" music video. She finds a clown crying on the side of the road. She gets off her bike and gives him a flower hat. As the video ends, the clown appears on stage. He walks up to the end of the catwalk and finds a Box with a handle. As he turns the handle, a trapdoor opens, and Pink is lifted up into the air on a rope. The song "Bad Influence" then starts. She gets lowered down onto the main stage and starts to sing. She then sings "Just Like a Pill", "Who Knew", Ave Mary A and "Don't Let Me Get Me". She then goes offstage. At some shows, Pink might perform "It's All Your Fault" after "Just Like A Pill".

A red couch appears on the stage and Pink is seen walking over to it. She then starts to sing "I Touch Myself". Whilst singing "I Touch Myself", hands come out of the couch and touch her. She then performs "Please Don't Leave Me". She briefly goes offstage whilst her dancers come onstage. She comes back on to perform "U + Ur Hand". A love heart shaped bed appears onstage as she performs "Leave Me Alone (I'm Lonely)" and "So What". She then goes offstage again. At some shows, Pink might perform "One Foot Wrong" after "I Touch Myself".

Her pianist then starts to play piano. She then comes back onstage to perform "Family Portrait". She then plays "I Don't Believe You" on the guitar. She would then perform "Crystal Ball", "Trouble" and "Babe I'm Gonna Leave You". She then goes offstage. At some shows, Pink might perform "Dear Mr. President" instead of "Crystal Ball".

Two of her dancers then come and perform ballet moves. This is then followed by "Sober" when she performs a trapeze. She quickly goes offstage and returns for "Bohemian Rhapsody". Four mirrors are brought onstage as she performs "Funhouse" and "Crazy". She says goodbye to the crowd and goes offstage. On the last leg, she would perform "Stupid Girls" after "Funhouse".

For the encore, She performed "Get the Party Started" and "Glitter in the Air". For all shows except for the Premiere, there would be a video montage of all her videos with "God Is a DJ" playing after "Get The Party Started". For "Get The Party Started", she would perform some acrobatics. She would then go offstage. After a costume change, she would come back onstage to perform the final number, "Glitter In The Air". She would be in the air performing some more acrobatics. Whilst that was happening, she would get lowered into the trapdoor that was used earlier in the show and be dipped in water. After she was lowered back onto the main stage, she bowed and walked offstage. The screen in the background showed THE END on it.

== Set list ==
Premiere
1. "Bad Influence"
2. "Just Like a Pill"
3. "Who Knew"
4. "Please Don't Leave Me"
5. "It's All Your Fault"
6. "I Touch Myself"
7. "One Foot Wrong"
8. "U + Ur Hand"
9. "Ave Mary A"
10. "Leave Me Alone (I'm Lonely)"
11. "So What"
12. "Family Portrait"
13. "I Don't Believe You"
14. "Crystal Ball"
15. "Trouble"
16. "Babe I'm Gonna Leave You"
17. "Sober"
18. "Bohemian Rhapsody"
19. "Funhouse"
20. "Crazy"

Encore

21. "Get the Party Started"
22. "Glitter in the Air"
European First Leg
1. "Bad Influence"
2. "Just Like a Pill"
3. "Who Knew"
4. "Ave Mary A"
5. "Don't Let Me Get Me"
6. "I Touch Myself"
7. "Please Don't Leave Me"
8. "U + Ur Hand"
9. "Leave Me Alone (I'm Lonely)"
10. "So What"
11. "Family Portrait"
12. "I Don't Believe You"
13. "Crystal Ball"
14. "Trouble"
15. "Babe I'm Gonna Leave You"
16. "Sober"
17. "Bohemian Rhapsody"
18. "Funhouse"
19. "Crazy"

Encore

20. "Get the Party Started"
21. "God Is a DJ" (Video Interlude)
22. "Glitter in the Air"
Australia
1. "Bad Influence"
2. "Just Like a Pill"
3. "It's All Your Fault (June 30, 2009 onwards)
4. "Who Knew"
5. "Ave Mary A (Except June 13, 30)
6. "Don't Let Me Get Me"
7. "I Touch Myself"
8. "Please Don't Leave Me"
9. "U + Ur Hand"
10. "Leave Me Alone (I'm Lonely)"
11. "So What"
12. "Family Portrait"
13. "I Don't Believe You"
14. "Crystal Ball (Except August 25)"
15. "Dear Mr. President" (August 25 only)"
16. "Trouble"
17. "Babe I'm Gonna Leave You"
18. "Sober (Except June 20)"
19. "Bohemian Rhapsody"
20. "Funhouse"
21. "Crazy"

Encore

22. "Get the Party Started"
23. "God Is A DJ" (Video Interlude)
24. "Glitter in the Air (Except June 16 and 20)"
North America
1. "Bad Influence"
2. "Just Like A Pill"
3. "Who Knew"
4. "Don't Let Me Get Me"
5. "I Touch Myself"
6. "Please Don't Leave Me"
7. "U + Ur Hand"
8. "Leave Me Alone (I'm Lonely)"
9. "So What"
10. "Family Portrait"
11. "I Don't Believe You"
12. "Dear Mr President"
13. "Trouble"
14. "Babe I'm Gonna Leave You"
15. "Sober"
16. "Bohemian Rhapsody"
17. "Funhouse"
18. "Crazy"

Encore

19. "Get the Party Started"
20. "God Is a DJ" (Video Interlude)
21. "Glitter in the Air"
European Second Leg
1. "Bad Influence"
2. "Just Like A Pill"
3. "Who Knew"
4. "Ave Mary A"
5. "Don't Let Me Get Me"
6. "I Touch Myself"
7. "Please Don't Leave Me"
8. "U + Ur Hand"
9. "Leave Me Alone (I'm Lonely)"
10. "So What"
11. "Family Portrait"
12. "I Don't Believe You"
13. "Dear Mr. President (October 17, 25 and 30 and November 7 and 23 only)"
14. "Crystal Ball (October 24, 25, 30 only)
15. "Trouble"
16. "Babe I'm Gonna Leave You"
17. "Sober (Except November 10 and December 15)"
18. "Bohemian Rhapsody"
19. "Funhouse"
20. "Stupid Girls"
21. "Crazy"

Encore

22. "Get the Party Started"
23. "God Is a DJ" (Video Interlude)
24. "Glitter in the Air"

=== Additional notes ===
- During the August 23 performance at the WIN Entertainment Centre in Wollongong, New South Wales, the tour crew and dancers did an impromptu performance of Michael Jackson's "Thriller".

== Tour dates ==
Date (2009)	City	Country	Venue
Europe
February 24	Nice	France	Palais Nikaïa
February 26	Antwerp	Belgium	Sportpaleis
February 28	Rotterdam	Netherlands	Sportpaleis van Ahoy
March 1	Rotterdam	Netherlands	Sportpaleis van Ahoy
March 5	Regensburg	Germany	Donau Arena
March 6	Friedrichshafen	Germany	Messe Friedrichshafen
March 8	Oberhausen	Germany	König Pilsener Arena
March 9	Paris	France	Palais Omnisports de Paris-Bercy
March 12	Mannheim	Germany	SAP Arena
March 14	Stuttgart	Germany	Hanns-Martin-Schleyer-Halle
March 17	Leipzig	Germany	Arena Leipzig
March 18	Berlin	Germany	O_{2} World
March 21	Geneva	Switzerland	SEG Geneva Arena
March 22	Zürich	Switzerland	Hallenstadion
March 24	Budapest	Hungary	Budapest Sports Arena
March 25	Vienna	Austria	Wiener Stadthalle
March 27	Frankfurt	Germany	Festhalle Frankfurt
March 28	Nuremberg	Germany	Arena Nürnberger Versicherung
March 30	Cologne	Germany	Lanxess Arena
April 1	Hamburg	Germany	Color Line Arena
April 2	Hamburg	Germany	Color Line Arena
April 4	Hanover	Germany	TUI Arena
April 6	Munich	Germany	Olympiahalle
April 7	Munich	Germany	Olympiahalle
April 8	Dortmund	Germany	Westfalenhallen
April 11	Glasgow	Scotland	Scottish Exhibition Hall 4
April 12	Glasgow	Scotland	Scottish Exhibition Hall 4
April 13	Aberdeen	Scotland	Press & Journal Arena
April 16	Birmingham	England	National Indoor Arena
April 17	Birmingham	England	National Indoor Arena
April 19	Dublin	Ireland	The O_{2}
April 20	Dublin	Ireland	The O_{2}
April 22	Belfast	Ireland	Odyssey Arena
April 23	Belfast	Ireland	Odyssey Arena
April 25	Manchester	England	Manchester Evening News Arena
April 26	Manchester	England	Manchester Evening News Arena
April 28	Newcastle	England	Metro Radio Arena
April 29	Liverpool	England	Echo Arena Liverpool
May 1	London	England	The O_{2} Arena
May 2	London	England	The O_{2} Arena
May 4	London	England	The O_{2} Arena
Oceania
May 22	Perth	Australia	Burswood Dome
May 23	Perth	Australia	Burswood Dome
May 26	Adelaide	Australia	Adelaide Entertainment Centre
May 27	Adelaide	Australia	Adelaide Entertainment Centre
May 30	Melbourne	Australia	Rod Laver Arena
May 31	Melbourne	Australia	Rod Laver Arena
June 3	Newcastle	Australia	Newcastle Entertainment Centre
June 4	Newcastle	Australia	Newcastle Entertainment Centre
June 6	Sydney	Australia	Sydney Entertainment Centre
June 7	Sydney	Australia	Sydney Entertainment Centre
June 9	Sydney	Australia	Sydney Entertainment Centre
June 10	Sydney	Australia	Sydney Entertainment Centre
June 12	Brisbane	Australia	Brisbane Entertainment Centre
June 13	Brisbane	Australia	Brisbane Entertainment Centre
June 15	Brisbane	Australia	Brisbane Entertainment Centre
June 16	Brisbane	Australia	Brisbane Entertainment Centre
June 18	Melbourne	Australia	Rod Laver Arena
June 20	Melbourne	Australia	Rod Laver Arena
June 21	Melbourne	Australia	Rod Laver Arena
June 23	Melbourne	Australia	Rod Laver Arena
June 24	Melbourne	Australia	Rod Laver Arena
June 26	Sydney	Australia	Sydney Entertainment Centre
June 27	Sydney	Australia	Sydney Entertainment Centre
June 29	Sydney	Australia	Sydney Entertainment Centre
June 30	Sydney	Australia	Sydney Entertainment Centre
July 3	Newcastle	Australia	Newcastle Entertainment Centre
July 4	Newcastle	Australia	Newcastle Entertainment Centre
July 14	Melbourne	Australia	Rod Laver Arena
July 15	Melbourne	Australia	Rod Laver Arena
July 17	Sydney	Australia	Sydney Entertainment Centre
July 18	Sydney	Australia	Sydney Entertainment Centre
July 22	Brisbane	Australia	Brisbane Entertainment Centre
July 23	Brisbane	Australia	Brisbane Entertainment Centre
July 25	Brisbane	Australia	Brisbane Entertainment Centre
July 26	Brisbane	Australia	Brisbane Entertainment Centre
July 27 (Note: Originally July 20.)	Brisbane	Australia	Brisbane Entertainment Centre
July 29	Melbourne	Australia	Rod Laver Arena
July 30	Melbourne	Australia	Rod Laver Arena
August 1	Melbourne	Australia	Rod Laver Arena
August 2	Melbourne	Australia	Rod Laver Arena
August 4	Adelaide	Australia	Adelaide Entertainment Centre
August 5	Adelaide	Australia	Adelaide Entertainment Centre
August 7	Perth	Australia	Burswood Dome
August 8	Perth	Australia	Burswood Dome
August 10	Adelaide	Australia	Adelaide Entertainment Centre
August 11	Adelaide	Australia	Adelaide Entertainment Centre
August 13	Melbourne	Australia	Rod Laver Arena
August 14	Melbourne	Australia	Rod Laver Arena
August 16	Canberra	Australia	AIS Arena
August 17	Canberra	Australia	AIS Arena
August 19	Melbourne	Australia	Rod Laver Arena
August 20	Melbourne	Australia	Rod Laver Arena
August 22	Wollongong	Australia	WIN Entertainment Centre
August 23	Wollongong	Australia	WIN Entertainment Centre
August 25	Brisbane	Australia	Brisbane Entertainment Centre
August 26	Brisbane	Australia	Brisbane Entertainment Centre
August 28	Sydney	Australia	Acer Arena
August 29	Sydney	Australia	Acer Arena
North America
September 15 (Note: Originally scheduled at WaMu Theater, but the venue was upgraded due to high demand.)	Seattle	United States	KeyArena
September 17	San Jose	United States	HP Pavilion
September 18	Los Angeles	United States	Staples Center
September 20	Glendale	United States	Jobing.com Arena
September 23	Dallas	United States	American Airlines Center
September 24	Houston	United States	Toyota Center
September 26	Rosemont	United States	Allstate Arena
September 28	Fairfax	United States	Patriot Center
September 30	Toronto	Canada	Air Canada Centre
October 2	Boston	United States	TD Garden
October 3	Philadelphia	United States	Wachovia Spectrum
October 5	New York City	United States	Madison Square Garden
Europe
October 14	Dublin	Ireland	The O_{2}
October 15	Dublin	Ireland	The O_{2}
October 17	Belfast	Ireland	Odyssey Arena
October 18	Belfast	Ireland	Odyssey Arena
October 20	Glasgow	Scotland	Scottish Exhibition Hall 4
October 21	Glasgow	Scotland	Scottish Exhibition Hall 4
October 23	Manchester	England	Manchester Evening News Arena
October 24	Manchester	England	Manchester Evening News Arena
October 25 (Note: Originally December 13.)	Manchester	England	Manchester Evening News Arena
October 27	Liverpool	England	Echo Arena
October 28	Sheffield	England	Sheffield Arena
October 30	Birmingham	England	National Indoor Arena
October 31	Birmingham	England	National Indoor Arena
November 2	Newcastle	England	Metro Radio Arena
November 3	Nottingham	England	Trent FM Arena
November 5	Antwerp	Belgium	Sportpaleis
November 7	Copenhagen	Denmark	Forum Copenhagen
November 9	Oslo	Norway	Oslo Spektrum
November 10	Stockholm	Sweden	Ericsson Globe
November 12	Helsinki	Finland	Hartwall Areena
November 19	Prague	Czech Republic	O_{2} Arena
November 20	Frankfurt	Germany	Frankfurt Festhalle
November 21	Munich	Germany	Olympiahalle
November 23	Freiburg	Germany	Messe Freiburg
November 25	Stuttgart	Germany	Hanns-Martin-Schleyer-Halle
November 26	Erfurt	Germany	Messe Erfurt
November 28	Düsseldorf	Germany	ISS Dome
November 30	Oberhausen	Germany	König Pilsener Arena
December 2	Zürich	Switzerland	Hallenstadion
December 3	Zürich	Switzerland	Hallenstadion
December 5	Esch-sur-Alzette	Luxembourg	Rockhal
December 6 (Note: Originally scheduled for December 5, but was rescheduled to the next day, due to the addition of the Luxembourg concert.)	Rotterdam	Netherlands	Rotterdam Ahoy
December 8	London	England	The O_{2} Arena
December 10	London	England	The O_{2} Arena
December 12 (Note: Originally November 15.)	Bremen	Germany	AWD Dome
December 13 (Note: Originally November 17.)	Dortmund	Germany	Westfalenhallen
December 15	Geneva	Switzerland	SEG Geneva Arena
December 17	Vienna	Austria	Wiener Stadthalle
December 19	Stuttgart	Germany	Hanns-Martin-Schleyer-Halle
December 20	Hanover	Germany	TUI Arena

== Box office score data ==
Venue	City	Attendance	Gross revenue
Palais Nikaïa	Nice	8,134 / 8,500 (96%)	$418,904
Sportpaleis	Antwerp	15,948 / 16,234 (98%)	$768,137
Sportpaleis van Ahoy	Rotterdam	30,916 / 30,916 (100%)	$1,925,797
Palais Omnisports de Paris-Bercy	Paris	16,488 / 16,488 (100%)	$912,420
The O_{2} Arena	London	92,918 / 93,590 (99%)	$4,740,905
Burswood Dome	Perth	70,613 / 73,044 (97%)	$5,675,332
Adelaide Entertainment Centre	Adelaide	52,471 / 55,470 (95%)	$4,283,421
Rod Laver Arena	Melbourne	214,956 / 222,214 (96%)	$17,234,669
Newcastle Entertainment Centre	Newcastle	29,021 / 29,492 (98%)	$2,372,605
Sydney Entertainment Centre	Sydney	116,772 / 120,344 (97%)	$9,538,321
Brisbane Entertainment Centre	Brisbane	136,114 / 142,800 (95%)	$11,277,153
AIS Arena	Canberra	9,499 / 9,737(98%)	$936,990
WIN Entertainment Centre	Wollongong	10,730 / 11,007(98%)	$1,059,814
Acer Arena	Sydney	29,648 / 29,648 (100%)	$3,066,820
KeyArena	Seattle	12,580 / 12,580 (100%)	$369,858
SAP Center	San Jose	13,058 / 13,058(100%)	$512,092
Staples Center	Los Angeles	12,751 / 12,751(100%)	$675,718
Jobing.com Arena	Glendale	14,039 / 14,039(100%)	$495,086
American Airlines Center	Dallas	13,195 / 13,195(100%)	$448,718
Toyota Center	Houston	8,563 / 8,563(100%)	$393,197
Allstate Arena	Rosemont	14,472 / 14,472 (100%)	$688,569
EagleBank Arena	Fairfax	6,565 / 6,565 (100%)	$278,594
Air Canada Centre	Toronto	15,193 / 15,193 (100%)	$878,461
Wachovia Spectrum	Philadelphia	15,370 / 15,370 (100%)	$674,862
Madison Square Garden	New York City	15,056 / 15,056 (100%)	$909,149
Total		975,070 / 1,000,326 (98%)	$70,535,592

== Reception ==
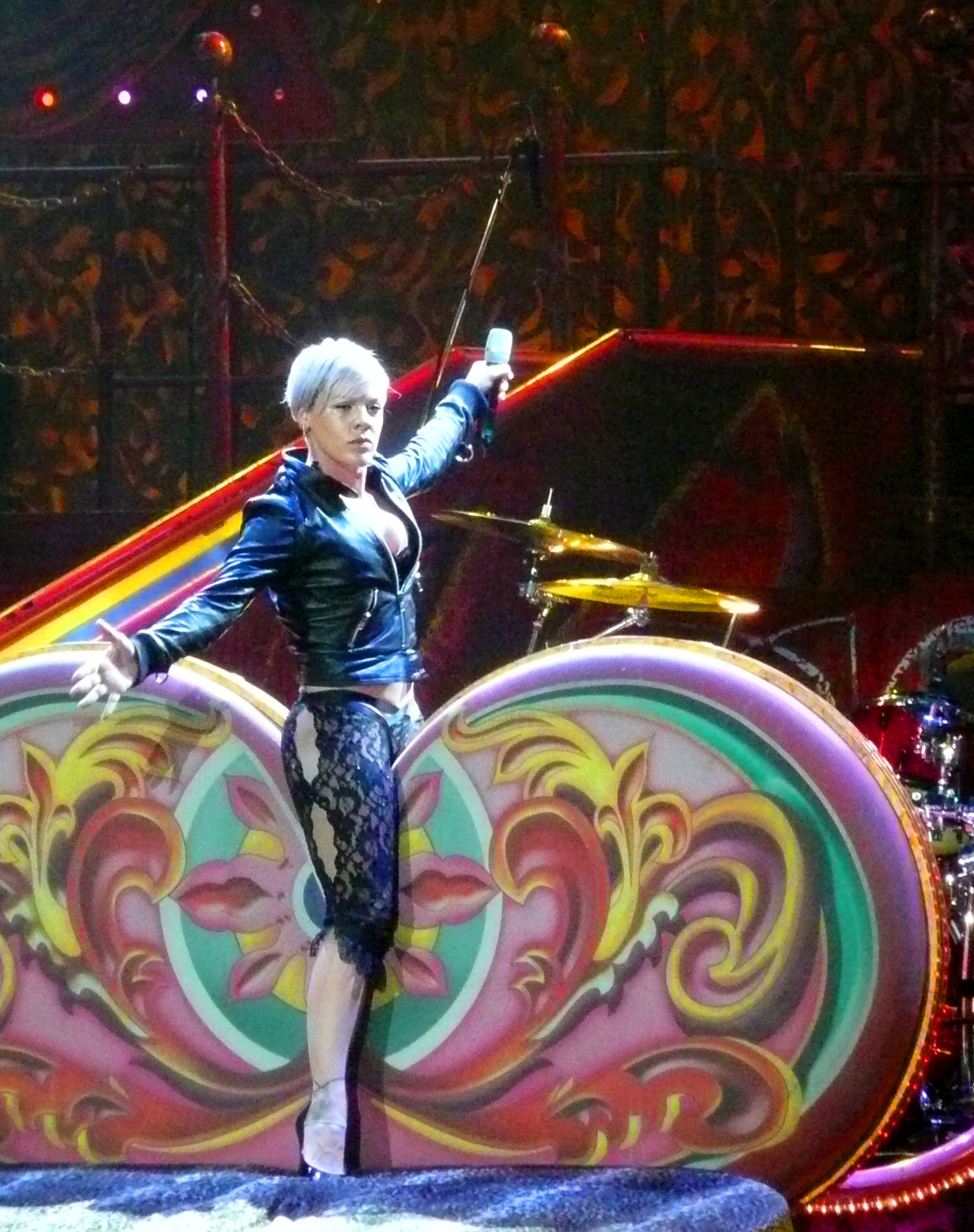
Pink during her Funhouse Tour in Düsseldorf on November 28, 2009.

=== Commercial ===
Overall ticket sales are estimated to have surpassed nearly two million. By July 2009, the tour grossed over $50 million, ranking 8th highest-grossing tour in the world. By November 2009, the tour grossed over $100 million, ranking as 5th highest-grossing tour of 2009.

Sales started on October 10, 2009 in the Netherlands. The show of February 28 at The Ahoy was sold out as a second show was scheduled for the following night. A third night at the arena was announced for December 5, 2009 (although this date was later changed to December 6, 2009). In Australia, ticket sales were exceptionally high. In 2007 she broke the record of biggest female tour ever with 35 shows in Australia, grossing $41 million. In 2009, she broke her own record, with 58 shows surpassing John Farnham's "Whispering Jack Tour" with the most shows in Australia. She performed 17 shows at Rod Laver Arena in Melbourne, Victoria, breaking Farnham's record for most shows at the venue during one tour. In Sydney, Pink performed 12 shows—of which 10 were performed at the Sydney Entertainment Centre. She performed for nearly 110,000 spectators (at this arena), making her the biggest live act in Sydney (surpassing Kylie Minogue with an attendance record of nearly 93,000 spectators). The American singer/songwriter performed at Melbourne's Rod Laver Arena on seventeen nights throughout the summer with ticket sales topping $17.2 million ($21.7 Australian). Combined attendance for all shows at the Melbourne tennis stadium was 214,956. Pink also played twelve shows in Sydney – ten shows during June and July at the Sydney Entertainment Centre and two in August at Acer Arena in the city's Olympic Park. Overall attendance in Sydney was 146,420 with $12.6 million in ticket sales ($15.5 Australian). With tour grosses topping $55 million from the Australian leg, Pink is ranked among the top ten tours worldwide for 2009.

To congratulate Pink on eleven sold out concerts at the Brisbane Entertainment Centre, the artist was given a public toilet located on the upper level of the arena, entitled "P!nk Ladies".

The Funhouse Summer Carnival Tour and the Funhouse Tour sold a combined total 3 million tickets.

=== Critical ===
The show received critical acclaim, with critics commenting on its theatricality and Pink's live singing.

- "A Pink show is more than just a pop concert – it's a major spectacle that you can’t take your eyes off. The show was simply mesmerising." – Aberdeen Evening Express
- "Pink can rock it, that's for sure. She has the anthems, the voice and the sass…4 stars" – The Glasgow Herald
- "She's no slouch as an aerial dare-devil, but here's one rock star at her most compelling when she has two feet planted squarely on the ground." – The Independent
- "Her singing was perfect, even when she was suspended mid-air, on her back and spinning rapidly on her harness." – Express & Star
- Her stage presence was also praised as "alluring and suggestive", likening the show to Janet Jackson's Velvet Rope Tour. – OC Register

== Broadcast and recordings ==
A DVD and live album of the tour was recorded on July 17 and 18, 2009 in Sydney, Australia. The DVD includes both "It's All Your Fault" and "Ave Mary A". Pink: Live in Australia was released in Australia on October 14, 2009, two days before its planned release. It was scheduled for release on October 2, 2009 but had to be pushed backed due to overwhelming demand. The DVD was also released in The Netherlands on October 28, 2009 and in the United Kingdom on November 2, 2009. An alternate version of the DVD was released in the United States on October 27, 2009. This version, titled Funhouse Tour: Live in Australia, includes the tour DVD, but is also sold with a live CD of the same concert.

The concert was also aired on VH1 on January 1, 2010 as the premiere concert of their "Friday Night Alright" block.

== Personnel ==
- Lead vocals, aerobatics, dancing, acoustic guitar, executive producer, creator – P!nk
- Musical director, keyboards, vocals – Paul Mirkovich
- Drums, Cello – Mark Schulman
- Lead guitar – Justin Derrico
- Bass guitar – Eva Gardner
- Keyboards, rhythm guitar, vocals – Kat Lucas
- Violin, vocals –Jessy Greene
- Vocals – Stacy Campbell
- Vocals – Jenny Douglas-Foote
- Dancing, choreography – Alison Faulk
- Dancing, choreography – Leo Moctezuma
- Dancing – Reina Hidalgo
- Dancing – Nikki Tuazon
- Dancing – Addie Yungmee
- Aerialist, Dancing – Sebastien Stella
- Aerial choreography – Dreya Weber
- Stage director, executive producer – Baz Halpin
- Director – Larn Poland
- Tour producer – Roger Davies (RDWM)
- Tour manager – Nick R. Cua

== See also ==
- List of highest-grossing concert tours by women
