= Funhouse (Pink album) =

Studio album by Pink
- Released: October 24, 2008
- Recorded: 2007–2008
- Studios: Maratone (Stockholm, Sweden); House of Blues (Los Angeles, California); Sha Recording (Malibu, California); 3:20 Studios (Los Feliz, California); Henson (Los Angeles); Decibel Studios (Stockholm, Sweden); Modern Dirt Laboratories (London, England); Electric Lady Studios (New York City, New York); Malibuddha (Malibu, California); Chateau Marmont (Los Angeles); The Document Room (Malibu, California); Westside Pacific Music, Inc. (Pacific Palisades, California); Magic Shop (New York City, New York)
- Genre: Pop rock
- Length: 45:05
- Labels: LaFace; Jive
- Producers: Al Clay; Danja; Jimmy Harry; Tony Kanal; Billy Mann; MachoPsycho; Max Martin; Butch Walker; Pete Wallace; Eg White

Pink chronology
The Remixes (2007)	Funhouse (2008)	Funhouse Tour: Live in Australia (2009)

Singles from Funhouse
- 1. "So What" Released: August 25, 2008; 2. "Sober" Released: November 10, 2008; 3. "Please Don't Leave Me" Released: February 16, 2009; 4. "Bad Influence" Released: May 8, 2009; 5. "Funhouse" Released: August 3, 2009; 6. "I Don't Believe You" Released: October 5, 2009; 7. "Glitter in the Air" Released: January 31, 2010

Funhouse is the fifth studio album by American singer and songwriter Pink, released by LaFace Records and Jive Records in Europe on October 24, 2008, and on October 28 in the United States. A pop and pop rock record, Funhouse was inspired by Pink's separation from her husband, Carey Hart. To record the album, she enlisted her previous collaborators, such as Billy Mann, Butch Walker, Max Martin and MachoPsycho, while also involving new music producers and songwriters, such as Danja, Jimmy Harry, Tony Kanal and Eg White.

The album received positive reviews from music critics. It debuted at number two on the Billboard 200 chart, selling 180,000 copies in its first week and reached number one on the charts in seven countries including Australia, New Zealand, the Netherlands, Ireland and the United Kingdom. Overall, it peaked inside the top ten in more than twenty countries. It was certified as double-platinum by Recording Industry Association of America and 13 times platinum by Australian Recording Industry Association.

Seven singles were released from the album. The lead single, "So What" became a huge commercial success, topping the US Billboard Hot 100, additionally to twelve more countries, including the UK, Canada and Australia. "Sober" and "Please Don't Leave Me" also became successful, entering the top ten in many countries, additionally peaking at numbers fifteen and seventeen on the Hot 100 respectively. The seventh single, "Glitter in the Air", was released after her critically acclaimed performance at the 52nd Grammy Awards, which was honored as one of the best in the history of Grammy.

To further promote the album, Pink embarked on the worldwide Funhouse Tour in 2009, which broke the record for the biggest tour in Australian history, and the Funhouse Summer Carnival stadium tour at Europe in 2010. The tours sold a combined total 3 million tickets, and brought the tour to a final gross of $150 million. Funhouse earned Pink three Grammy Award nominations and five MTV Video Music Award nominations. As of 2012, Funhouse has sold 7 million copies worldwide.

== Background and development ==
After months of speculation, Pink announced in February 2008 that she and her husband, Carey Hart, had separated. According to her publicist, "Pink and Carey Hart have separated. This decision was made by best friends with a huge amount of love and respect for one another. While the marriage is over, their friendship has never been stronger."The couple sought marriage counseling during their separation in hopes of reconciliation.

Pink wrote and recorded approximately 30 to 35 songs for Funhouse. "It's like getting rid of your children: 'I like that one too, but I'm going to let that one die,'" she said of choosing the album's tracks. "The good thing now is that different countries want extra songs and B-sides, so there's always a home for the other kids." Pink traveled internationally to write and record the album, working with Eg White in London and with Max Martin in Stockholm. "It was really good to get out of my house and get away from my life. No distractions. No phones", Pink said of her sessions outside the U.S. During the recording sessions with Martin, they recorded a song titled "Whataya Want from Me", which didn't make the final cut of Funhouse, and was passed to Adam Lambert for his debut album. After the Lambert's recording became a single and received a worldwide success, Pink released her original recording of the song in, a.o., the Australian edition of her 2010 compilation album Greatest Hits... So Far!!!.

Originally, Pink wanted to call her album Heartbreak Is a Motherfucker, but her record label declined because of a fear that offensive language would affect sales. She also said that she did not want the album to look like a break-up album: "There is a lot of that [break-up], but there is fun happening too and that's why I named it Funhouse in the end." Pink has also stated that she sees life as a carnival: "Clowns are supposed to be happy, but they are really scary. Carnivals are supposed to be fun, but really they are kind of creepy." [...] "and that's like life to me, and love. Love is supposed to be fun, but it can sometimes be really scary. And the funhouse mirrors that make you look so distorted that you don't recognize yourself and you ask yourself, 'How did I get here? How do I get out of here?' But, you think that you want to do it again. That is the same as love and life. It's a metaphor for being in love and for life."

The song that Moore is most proud of is "Crystal Ball". She said about the track: "I recorded it in one take and we didn't mix it. It just went straight to master. It was all about a vibe and not about perfection or being polished. I just love that song and I loved recording it."

== Music and lyrics ==
Pink has stated that this album is her most vulnerable and personal album to date. Much of the album's subject matter alludes to the fact that Moore had recently separated from her husband, Carey Hart. The first song, "So What", opens with: "I guess I just lost my husband/I don't know where he went". "Please Don't Leave Me" also addresses the split. The artist sums up its theme thus: "Okay, I'm an asshole, but love me anyway." In "Mean", she sings, "It was good in the beginning/but how did we get so mean?" She wrote the song with Billy Mann, who also aided her with the songs "Stupid Girls", "Dear Mr. President" and "I'm Not Dead" (all 2006), among others.

In "It's All Your Fault", Pink blames her lover for giving her hopes of a love relationship, then simply giving up on her. She proclaims in the lyrics "I conjure up the thought of being gone, but I'd probably even do that wrong." In "Glitter in the Air", Pink asks many questions such as, "Have you ever looked fear in the face and said I just don't care?", and "Have you ever hated yourself for staring at the phone?" Pink admits, "I still don't have some of the answers to the questions I pose on this record. I'm still figuring it all out."

The track "Sober", which is the album's second single, was written by Pink at a party hosted at her home, where everyone was drunk or drinking except for her, and she wanted them all to leave. She went to the beach and had a line in her head saying "How do I feel so good sober?". Eventually it had nothing to do with alcohol but with identities. "How do I feel so good with just me, without anyone to lean on?", Pink said in an interview.

"Ave Mary A" deals with world issues and problems. "One Foot Wrong" talks about an acid trip that went wrong, but also has an underlying theme. "That song is also about losing control and how easy it is to lose the plot in life and teeter on the edge." In the title track "Funhouse" she tells that it used to be fun. "It's about when the box you're in doesn't fit anymore, burn that fucker down and start a new one."

== Promotion ==
On September 7, 2008, Pink performed "So What" at the 2008 American MTV Video Music Awards. On November 6, 2008, she performed this song again at the MTV Europe Music Awards during a live show. Pink performed second single, "Sober", at the 2008 American Music Awards on November 23, 2008, She held a secret showcase in Barcelona, Spain on November 20.

On September 13, 2009, she went on to perform "Sober" again, at the 2009 MTV Video Music Awards. On September 16 Pink performed "I Don't Believe You" along with "Funhouse" on Jimmy Kimmel Live! She also performed the song on February 5, 2010, on The Oprah Winfrey Show. Pink performed "Glitter in the Air" on January 31, 2010, at the 52nd Grammy Awards, where she received for her performance a standing ovation. Also, many celebrities and media outlets praised her performance.

=== Tour ===
European, Australian and North American tour dates for the Funhouse Tour were announced to support the album in early 2009. The first leg of the Funhouse Tour would go throughout Europe. Pink later did a 3-month stint in Australia. The third leg of the tour took place in North America, with 11 dates in the United States and 1 date in Canada. The fourth leg consisted of 3 months around Europe, starting in Dublin, Ireland on October 14 and finishing December 20 in Hannover, Germany.

Pink broke her own record in Australia where she sold-out seventeen shows in Melbourne (more than any other city). Melbourne also had the most tickets and had the biggest revenue. Pink also sold out seven consecutive shows in Sydney in a collective week, all within forty minutes. The overwhelming demand for shows in Australia made Pink surpass her record-breaking run of 35 sold-out shows achieved on the 2007 Australian leg of the I'm Not Dead Tour. The Funhouse Tour made 58 shows in Australia, which made Pink the most successful artist to ever tour the country. Other records broken by the tour included the most shows at the Sydney Entertainment Centre and Brisbane Entertainment Centre.

Also, the tour dates announced in the US would become the first time that Pink would tour in her home country since 2006. The first show was held in Seattle in September 2009 and twelve dates later the US leg of the tour ended in New York City.

With the release of the album's Tour Edition, a live album was released featuring live performances of twelve songs, plus "Push You Away", a studio track which was previously unreleased; the song is also included on The Tour Edition. While the DVD includes 23 live performances, including 2 bonus performances. A Blu-ray version of the DVD was also released. The album and DVD were recorded in Sydney, Australia on July 17 and 18.

A year later, she did the Funhouse Summer Carnival Tour in Europe.

== Singles ==
"So What"
A 21-second sample of "So What" featuring Pink singing about her post-breakup adventures to a martial beat and synth backing.

The album's lead single, "So What', first premiered digitally in various countries on August 11, 2008. It impacted US contemporary hit radio on August 25. The song was written by Pink, in collaboration with Max Martin and Shellback, about her separation with Carey Hart. The song received positive reviews from music critics. It has become Pink's biggest success to that date, peaking at number one in eleven countries around the world, including the US, where it became her first solo single and second overall, after "Lady Marmelade" in 2001 to top the Billboard Hot 100. Song's music video, directed by Dave Meyers, premiered on August 22, and featuring Hart's cameo. It was considered as one of the best music videos of the year. At the 51st Grammy Awards, it received a nomination in the category of Best Female Pop Vocal Performance, while the music video was presented at the "Best Female Video" category at the 2009 MTV Video Music Awards.

On November 10, 2008, "Sober" was released as the second single from the album. The power pop song, lyrically speaking of addiction, it was written by Pink, Nate "Danja" Hills, Kara DioGuardi and Marcella Araica, and produced by Danja, Kanal and Jimmy Harry. It proved to be commercial success, peaking within top ten in more than ten countries, including the UK, Canada, and Australia, while peaking at number fifteen on the Billboard Hot 100. The song's video, directed by Jonas Åkerlund, premiered November 25 on Pink's official YouTube channel. "Sober" received the same nomination as "So What", but on the 52nd Grammy Awards. Third single, "Please Don't Leave Me", was released in January 2009 in Australia and in March 2009 in the United States. It also became successful, reaching top ten in several Europe countries, also peaking at number eight in Canada, twelve in the UK, and seventeen in the US. Its music video was directed by Meyers, and draws influences from the 1990 Stephen King-based film Misery, as well as other similar thrillers, including Cujo, The Shining and What Ever Happened to Baby Jane?. It utilizes both the horror/thriller genre, while also being interpretable as a dark comedy, which led her to release the censored version of the video.

"Bad Influence" was released as the fourth single in Australia, promoting the arrival of the Australian leg of the Funhouse Tour. It was released as the CD and digital single in May 2009. The song became a huge success in Oceania despite the absence of a music video, reaching the top ten in both Australia and New Zealand. It was released in Germany on March 26, 2010, where it reached number 26 on Germany's official Singles Chart and topped national airplay chart. In April 2011 it was released in Netherlands, to promote Pink's compilation album Greatest Hits... So Far!!!. "Funhouse" was released digitally in the US on July 2, 2009, as the fifth single from the album. The music video premiered on June 20, 2009, in the United Kingdom on 4music, featuring Tony Kanal of No Doubt, also the co-writer and the producer of the song, playing a piano. "Funhouse" charted moderately, reaching number 44 on the Hot 100. "I Don't Believe You", the sixth single, was released in the US on October 5, 2009, to Hot AC radio. It failed to enter the Billboard Hot 100.

"Glitter in the Air" was immediately delivered to radio as a new single by Jive Records after she performed it at 52nd Grammy Awards, before the show broadcast was even over. On the February 20, 2010, issue of Billboard, the song debuted on the Hot 100 at number 18, Pink's second highest debut since "So What", as well as her seventh entry from Funhouse, which gives the song credit for raising the sales of the album and pulling it back to the Top 20 on the Billboard 200. On February 1, the live audio recording of the performance was released digitally. "Ave Mary A" was released as a single in Australia in 2010 and peaked at #10 on the Australian Airplay Chart. It was the 24th-most played track on Australian radio in 2010 but never charted on the ARIA Singles Chart.

== Critical reception ==
Professional ratings
Aggregate scores
Source	Rating
Metacritic	69/100
Review scores
Source	Rating
AllMusic	4/5 stars
Blender	3/5 stars
Entertainment Weekly	B+
The Guardian	3/5 stars
musicOMH	3/5 stars
PopMatters	6/10
Rolling Stone	3/5 stars
Slant	3.5/5 stars
Spin	4/5 stars
Sputnikmusic	3/5

Funhouse has a score of 69 out of 100 from Metacritic based on 20 "generally favorable" reviews. Sydney's The Daily Telegraph gave it 4.5 stars, writing, "The record is a balanced blend of upbeat pop gems and midtempo ballads [...] The power of Pink's pop lies in the clever juxtaposition of heartfelt honesty about her life with anthematic choruses and irresistible melodies tailormade to be screamed out by her fans."

Other positive reviews were published by US Magazine, which gave the album four stars, saying, "The rebellious Grammy winner again fuses unrestrained lyrics with perfect pop-rock hooks on her electrifying fifth CD. From her aggressive No. 1 hit 'So What' to the vulnerable 'Please Don't Leave Me' and the openhearted ballad 'I Don't Believe You', Pink confirms she's still in excellent fighting shape." In his Consumer Guide, Robert Christgau picked out the single from the album, "So What", as a "choice cut".

Less favorable reviews came from sources such as Rolling Stone and Blender, each giving the album three stars. Rolling Stone stated, "Pink has shown more personality before, and some cuts, including the goopy ballad "I Don't Believe You", make her sound like just another big-voiced chart-buster. Funhouse would be more fun if Pink went easier on the bad-love songs."

== Commercial performance ==
Funhouse debuted at number two on the United States Billboard 200 chart issued on November 18, 2008, with sales of 180,000, behind AC/DC's Wal-Mart exclusive, Black Ice, which claimed the top spot with its second-week sales of 271,000. In March 2009, it was certified platinum by the RIAA for shipments of over 1,000,000 copies, and as of June 2012, the album has sold 1,960,000 copies in the United States. It was Pink's highest-charting album in that country, until her sixth album The Truth About Love debuted at number one.

In Australia, record shops broke embargo and placed Funhouse on sale one day before its official release date; with only one day of sales, it became the fourth-highest selling album of the week, shifting 7,120 copies. Funhouse debuted officially at number one in Australia, and sold 86,273 units that week (the highest first week sales of 2008). Funhouse spent nine consecutive weeks at number one and has been certified 12× platinum by the Australian Recording Industry Association for 840,000 copies sold. The album ended both 2008 and 2009 as the second highest selling album of the year in Australia, and was reported in 2010 to be the second most successful album of the 2000–2009 decade.

In the United Kingdom, the album sold over 37,100 copies in its first day and 83,000 copies in its first five days. Funhouse became her first number-one album in the UK, entering at number one on November 2, 2008, and has been certified 4× Platinum by the British Phonographic Industry for selling over 1,200,000 copies. Funhouse was the ninth biggest selling record of 2008, and the twenty-third biggest seller of 2009.

In others Europeans nations, Funhouse debuted at number one in the Netherlands, New Zealand (certified 3× Platinum), and Switzerland (certified 3× Platinum) In Germany, Funhouse debuted at number two. There, it is the sixth best-selling album of 2009 and the twenty-third best-selling album of 2010, shipping more than 1,000,000 copies as of June 2010. It is certified 4× Platinum. In France, as well as in Austria, the album debuted respectively at number 4 and number 3, and achieved success in being certified Platinum and remained Pink's longuest-running album in both of countries.

== Accolades ==
=== 2008 ===
Awards ceremony	Award category	Subject	Result
Fuse TV	Best Video of 2008	"So What"	Nominated
MTV Europe Music Awards	Most Addictive Track	"So What"	Won
Rockbjörnen Awards (Sweden)	Best International Artist	Herself	Nominated
Virgin Music Awards (UK)	Best International Act	Herself	Nominated
World Music Awards	World Best Selling Rock/Pop Artist	All sales of 2008	Nominated

=== 2009 ===
Awards ceremony	Award category	Subject	Result
MTV Australia Awards	Best Video	"So What"	Won
Brit Awards	Best International Female Artist	Herself	Nominated
Grammy Awards	Best Female Pop Vocal Performance	"So What"	Nominated
International Dance Music Awards	Best Pop Dance Track	"So What"	Nominated
Meteor Music Awards	Best International Female	Herself	Nominated
NRJ Radio Music Awards (France)	Best International Female	Herself	Nominated
NRJ Radio Music Awards (France)	Best International Album	Funhouse	Nominated
MTV Video Music Awards	Best Female Video	"So What"	Nominated

=== 2010 ===
Awards ceremony	Award category	Subject	Result
Grammy Awards	Best Female Pop Vocal Performance	"Sober"	Nominated
Grammy Awards	Best Pop Vocal Album	Funhouse	Nominated
MTV Video Music Awards	Best Direction in a Video	Funhouse (Dave Meyers)	Nominated
MTV Video Music Awards	Best Editing in a Video	Funhouse (song) (Chris Davis)	Nominated

== Track listing ==
Standard edition
No.	Title	Writer(s)	Producer(s)	Length
1.	"So What"	Alecia Moore; Max Martin; Shellback	Martin	3:34
2.	"Sober"	Moore; Nathaniel Hills; Kara DioGuardi; Marcella Araica	Danja; Tony Kanal; Jimmy Harry	4:10
3.	"I Don't Believe You"	Moore; Martin	Martin	4:35
4.	"One Foot Wrong"	Moore; Francis White	Eg White	3:22
5.	"Please Don't Leave Me"	Moore; Martin	Martin	3:51
6.	"Bad Influence"	Moore; Billy Mann; Butch Walker; Robin Lynch; Niklas Olovson	Mann; Walker; MachoPsycho	3:35
7.	"Funhouse"	Moore; Tony Kanal; Jimmy Harry	Kanal; Jimmy Harry	3:24
8.	"Crystal Ball"	Moore; Mann	Mann	3:25
9.	"Mean"	Moore; Walker	Walker	4:17
10.	"It's All Your Fault"	Moore; Martin; Shellback	Martin	3:51
11.	"Ave Mary A"	Moore; Mann; Pete Wallace	Mann; Al Clay; Wallace^{[a]}	3:15
12.	"Glitter in the Air"	Moore; Mann	Mann	3:46
Total length:				45:05

International edition and German Tchibo special edition (bonus track)
No.	Title	Writer(s)	Producer(s)	Length
13.	"This Is How It Goes Down" (featuring Travis McCoy)	Moore; Walker	Walker	3:18

International digital edition (bonus track)
No.	Title	Writer(s)	Producer(s)	Length
14.	"Why Did I Ever Like You"	Moore; Greg Wells	Wells	3:25

International deluxe edition (bonus track)
No.	Title	Writer(s)	Producer(s)	Length
14.	"Could've Had Everything"	Moore; White	White	3:09

Tour edition (bonus track)
No.	Title	Writer(s)	Producer(s)	Length
14.	"Push You Away"	Moore; Walker	Walker	3:02

UK and Japanese enhanced edition (bonus tracks)
No.	Title	Writer(s)	Producer(s)	Length
14.	"Boring"	Moore; Martin; Shellback	Martin	3:14
15.	"So What" (music video)			3:45

Digital expanded edition (bonus tracks)
No.	Title	Writer(s)	Producer(s)	Length
13.	"Why Did I Ever Like You"	Moore; Greg Wells	Wells	3:25
14.	"Could've Had Everything"	Moore; White	White	3:09

Apple Music deluxe edition (bonus video)
No.	Title	Length
15.	"So What" (music video)	3:45

iTunes Store deluxe edition (pre-order bonus track)
No.	Title	Writer(s)	Producer(s)	Length
16.	"This Is How It Goes Down" (featuring Travis McCoy)	Moore; Walker	Walker	3:20

German Tchibo special edition bonus CD – Live in Australia EP
No.	Title	Writer(s)	Length
1.	"Bad Influence" (Live)	Moore; Mann; Walker; Lynch; Olovson	3:51
2.	"Just Like a Pill" (Live)	Moore; Dallas Austin	3:26
3.	"I Don't Believe You" (Live)	Moore; Martin	4:36
4.	"Glitter in the Air" (Live)	Moore; Mann	5:16
5.	"Ave Mary A" (Live)	Moore; Mann; Wallace	3:23

Tour edition (bonus DVD)
No.	Title	Writer(s)	Producer(s)	Length
1.	"So What" (music video)	Moore; Martin; Shellback	Martin	3:35
2.	"Funhouse" (music video)	Moore; Kanal; Harry	Kanal; Harry	3:09
3.	"Sober" (music video)	Moore; Hills; DioGuardi; Ariaca	Danja; Kanal; Harry	4:24
4.	"Please Don't Leave Me" (music video)	Moore; Martin	Martin	3:53
5.	"I Don't Believe You" (Live In Australia)	Moore; Martin		4:36
6.	"Please Don't Leave Me" (Live In Australia)	Moore; Martin		3:52
7.	"So What" (Live In Australia)	Moore; Martin; Shellback		3:35
8.	"Track-by-Track" (video commentary) (not available on iTunes Store)

Notes

- ^{^[a]} signifies a co-producer.

== Personnel ==
Adapted from AllMusic.

- Deborah Anderson – photography
- Tommy Andersson – assistant, audio engineer
- Marcella Araica – audio engineer, engineer
- Guy Baker – trumpet
- Stevie Blacke – arranger, performer, string arrangements, strings
- Daniel Chase – programming
- Al Clay – audio production, engineer, mixing, producer
- Tom Coyne – mastering
- Jake Davies – audio engineer, audio production, engineer, mixing assistant
- Roger Davies – management
- DJ Willrock – turntables
- Darren Dodd – drums
- Chris Galland – assistant, audio engineer, guitar, mixing assistant
- Brian Gately – production coordination
- Şerban Ghenea – mixing
- Matty Green – audio engineer, mixing assistant
- Keith Gretlein – assistant engineer, audio engineer
- Kinnda Hamid – background vocals
- John Hanes – audio engineer, digital editing
- Jimmy Harry – audio engineer, engineer, guitars, keyboards, producer
- Jeri Helden – art direction, design
- Femio Hernández – assistant, audio engineer
- Michael Ilbert – audio engineer, engineer
- Henrik Janson – arranger, string arrangements, string conductor, strings
- Uli Janson – arranger, string arrangements, string conductor, strings
- Neil Kanal – assistant engineer, audio engineer
- Tony Kanal – bass, producer
- Josh Kane – drums
- Craig Logan – A&R
- Tom Lord-Alge – mixing
- Dag Lundquist – engineer
- Robin Mortensen Lynch – guitar, programming
- MachoPsycho – audio production
- Billy Mann – audio production, guitars, keyboards, mixing, producer, background vocals
- Roger Manning – keyboards, piano
- Steven Manzano – management
- Max Martin – audio engineer, audio production, engineer, guitar, bass guitar, keyboards, producer
- Andrew McPherson – photography
- Lasse Mortén – assistant, audio engineer
- Niklas Olovson – bass, programming
- Amy Oresman – make-up
- Peter Parente – guitars
- Lisa Pinero – production coordination
- P!nk – primary artist, lead vocals, background vocals
- Serena Radaelli – hair stylist
- Delwyn Rees – management
- Tim Roberts – assistant, audio engineer
- Nancy Roof – a&r
- Michele Schweitzer – publicity
- Shellback – bass, drum programming, drums, guitars, keyboards, omnichord
- Paul Starr – make-up
- Nick Steinhardt – art direction, design
- Mark "Spike" Stent – mixing
- Stockholm Session Strings – strings
- Trish Summerville – stylist
- Irene Taylor – management
- Doug Tyo – assistant
- Butch Walker – audio production, bass, guitar, keyboards, percussion, producer, programming, background vocals
- Pete Wallace – audio engineer, bass, engineer, guitar, harmonium, piano, producer, programming
- Joey Waronker – drums
- Eg White – arranger, audio production, drums, engineer, guitar, Hammond B3 organ, moog bass, percussion, producer, strings
- John Yarling – drums
- Joe Zook – audio engineer, engineer

== Charts ==
=== Weekly charts ===
Chart (2008–2009)	Peak position
Argentine Albums (CAPIF)	29
Australian Albums (ARIA)	1
Austrian Albums (Ö3 Austria)	3
Belgian Albums (Ultratop Flanders)	3
Belgian Albums (Ultratop Wallonia)	10
Canadian Albums (Billboard)	3
Croatian International Albums (HDU)	8
Czech Albums (ČNS IFPI)	5
Danish Albums (Hitlisten)	4
Dutch Albums (MegaCharts)	1
European Top 100 Albums (Billboard)	1
Finnish Albums (Suomen virallinen lista)	5
French Albums (SNEP)	4
German Albums (Offizielle Top 100)	2
Greek Albums (IFPI)	20
Greek International Albums (IFPI)	8
Hungarian Albums (MAHASZ)	3
Irish Albums (IRMA)	1
Italian Albums (FIMI)	20
Japanese Albums (Oricon)	33
Mexican Albums (Top 100 Mexico)	47
New Zealand Albums (RMNZ)	1
Norwegian Albums (VG-lista)	18
Polish Albums (ZPAV)	8
Russian Albums (2M)	8
Scottish Albums (Official Charts)	1
Slovenian Albums (IFPI)	3
South African Albums (RiSA)	40
Spanish Albums (PROMUSICAE)	43
Swedish Albums (Sverigetopplistan)	3
Swiss Albums (Schweizer Hitparade)	1
UK Albums (Official Charts)	1
US Billboard 200	2
US Indie Store Album Sales (Billboard)	4

=== Year-end charts ===
Chart (2008)	Position
Australian Albums (ARIA)	2
Austrian Albums (Ö3 Austria)	28
Belgian Albums (Ultratop Flanders)	70
Dutch Albums (MegaCharts)	45
French Albums (SNEP)	55
German Albums (Offizielle Top 100)	32
New Zealand Albums (RMNZ)	9
Swedish Albums (Sverigetopplistan)	57
Swiss Albums (Schweizer Hitparade)	11
UK Albums (OCC)	9
US Billboard 200	33
US Top Artists (Billboard)	79
US Top Comprehensive Albums (Billboard)	132
Worldwide Albums (IFPI)	13

Chart (2009)	Position
Australian Albums (ARIA)	2
Austrian Albums (Ö3 Austria)	4
Canadian Albums (Billboard)	17
Dutch Albums (MegaCharts)	25
German Albums (Offizielle Top 100)	6
Swedish Albums (Sverigetopplistan)	58
Swiss Albums (Schweizer Hitparade)	3
UK Albums (OCC)	23
US Billboard 200	16

Chart (2010)	Position
Australian Albums (ARIA)	34
European Top 100 Albums (Billboard)	25
German Albums (Offizielle Top 100)	23
UK Albums (OCC)	105
US Billboard 200	64

=== Decade-end charts ===
Chart (2000–2009)	Position
Australian Albums (ARIA)	2
Austrian Albums (Ö3 Austria)	22

== Certifications ==
Region	Certification	Certified units/sales
Australia (ARIA)	13× Platinum	910,000^{‡}
Austria (IFPI Austria)	3× Platinum	60,000^{*}
Belgium (BRMA)	Platinum	30,000^{*}
Brazil (Pro-Música Brasil)	Gold	30,000^{‡}
Canada (Music Canada)	4× Platinum	320,000^{^}
Denmark (IFPI Danmark)	Platinum	30,000^{^}
Finland (Musiikkituottajat)	Platinum	22,895
France (SNEP)	Platinum	100,000^{*}
GCC (IFPI Middle East)	Gold	3,000^{*}
Germany (BVMI)	4× Platinum	800,000^{^}
Hungary (MAHASZ)	Gold	3,000^{^}
Ireland (IRMA)	Platinum	15,000^{^}
Netherlands (NVPI)	Platinum	60,000^{^}
New Zealand (RMNZ)	4× Platinum	60,000^{‡}
Poland (ZPAV)	Gold	10,000^{*}
Russia (NFPF)	Platinum	20,000^{*}
Sweden (GLF)	Platinum	40,000^{‡}
Switzerland (IFPI Switzerland)	3× Platinum	90,000^{^}
United Kingdom (BPI)	4× Platinum	1,200,000
United States (RIAA)	3× Platinum	3,000,000^{‡}
^{*} Sales figures based on certification alone.^{^} Shipments figures based on certification alone.^{‡} Sales+streaming figures based on certification alone.

== Release history ==
Region	Date	Label	Catalogue
Netherlands	October 24, 2008	Sony Music Entertainment	0886974064923
Belgium	October 24, 2008	Sony Music Entertainment	0886974064923
Germany	October 24, 2008	Sony Music Entertainment	
Switzerland	October 24, 2008	Sony Music Entertainment	0886974064923
Australia	October 25, 2008	Sony Music Entertainment	88697406492
Japan	October 26, 2008	BMG Japan	
Hong Kong	October 27, 2008	Sony BMG HK	
Korea	October 27, 2008	Sony BMG	
Mexico	October 27, 2008	Sony BMG	886974064923
United Kingdom	October 27, 2008	RCA	88697406922
United States	October 28, 2008	LaFace	B001F0VHEM
Canada	October 28, 2008	LaFace	B001F0VHEM
Spain	October 28, 2008	LaFace	886974064923
Italy	October 28–29, 2008	Sony BMG	886976893510
Sweden	October 29, 2008	Sony BMG	
Brazil	October 31, 2008	Sony BMG	
Russia	November 3, 2008	Sony BMG	
Philippines	November 4, 2008	Sony Music Philippines	
Middle East (Standard + Steelbox)	November 5, 2008	Sony BMG	886973675922
Germany (Steelbox)	December 5, 2008	Sony BMG	
Poland (Tour Edition)	October 26, 2009	Sony BMG	
Middle East (Tour Edition)	October 26, 2009	LaFace	
United States (Live in Australia Edition)	October 27, 2009	LaFace	
United Kingdom (Tour Edition)	November 2, 2009	RCA	

== See also ==
- List of best-selling albums in Australia
