= Glambot =

Robotic high-speed camera system

The Glambot is a robotic high-speed camera photobooth originally directed by Joseph Kahn and currently associated with Cole Walliser, known for its use in capturing dynamic slow-motion videos of celebrities on the red carpet at various high-profile award ceremonies such as the Academy Awards, the Grammys, Golden Globes, the Emmys, and the People's Choice Awards.

== Development ==
The original concept for a high speed camera photobooth was created by Mitch Gross at AbelCine in 2009, using the Phantom HD Gold camera and called the Phantom Photo Booth. It did not include a robotic arm but did feature instant playback. Gary Snegaroff developed the Glambot as a tool to enhance red carpet coverage for E! and NBC live events and specials. Kahn directed the Glambot at its debut; later directors have included Nigel Barker at the 74th Golden Globe Awards and Cole Walliser at the 68th Primetime Emmy Awards.

== Use in filmmaking ==
The Glambot is primarily used at events to capture slow-motion footage of celebrities, emphasizing their outfits, makeup, and overall look.

== Technical aspects ==
The Glambot combines high-speed camera technology with robotic control to execute precise, smooth movements that capture detailed slow-motion footage. Walliser has said, "We shoot 1,000 frames in that one second. When we play it back at like 24/30 [frames per second]."

== Expansion and influence ==
The Glambot quickly became a sought-after feature at entertainment industry events. The Glambot's success has inspired similar high-speed robotic camera experiences across the party and entertainment industry.

== Commercial operators and adaptations ==
=== Red Carpet Robot ===
Red Carpet Robot is a commercial event activation concept that applies robotic slow-motion camera technology similar to that used by the Glambot at award shows to experiential and promotional settings. It has been featured in regional news coverage in Las Vegas, Nevada, where it was described as an event attraction that allows attendees to capture memorable robotic slow-motion footage at public and private events. The adaptation brings robotically controlled high-speed camera movements into live events, corporate functions, and branded activations beyond the red carpet context.
