= MachoPsycho =

Swedish songwriting team

MachoPsycho is a Swedish songwriting team consisting of Niklas "Nikey" Olovson and Robin Lynch. Nikey was born in Stenungsund, Sweden in 1966 and Robin was born in Sandnessjøen, Norway also in 1966. They are among Sweden's most successful songwriters and producers. They have sold millions of records worldwide. They have collaborated with artists like Pink, Cher, Justin Timberlake, Backstreet Boys, Vanessa Amorosi, Jessica Simpson, Esmee Denters, Keith Urban & Ilse DeLange.

== About ==
MachoPsycho are multi-platinum music producers based in Gothenburg, Sweden who exploded into mainstream music when they co-wrote and co-produced Pink's 2007 single Stupid Girls. It was a Top 10 across the globe and received numerous awards including a US Grammy nomination. Soon after, they started picking up traction writing and recording with Backstreet Boys, Teddy Geiger, Dirtie Blonde and Natasha Bedingfield.

== History ==
In 2008, the duo co-wrote and produced 9 songs for Ilse DeLange's platinum album, Incredible. They also worked on Pink's 2009 album Funhouse adding "Bad Influence" to their writer/producer resume.

As more and more artists began looking for that signature MachoPsycho touch, 2009 included cuts with RBD, Stereo, Elske De Wall, Queensberry, Name The Pet, Sunrise Avenue, and a co-production with Justin Timberlake on Esmée Denters' album Outta Here.

They are currently working with Universal Australia artist, Vanessa Amorosi, producing and co-writing her album Hazardous released 6 November 2009.

MachoPsycho continue to make hits at Fishhead Music Studios in Gothenburg, expanding their US, European and UK roster.

MachoPsycho are famous in the Eurovision Song Contest for the 2013 Norwegian entry they composed for Margaret Berger called I Feed You My Love, which took the 4th place. They also composed, for the 2015 Romanian National Selection, Lara Lee Superman, co-written with Nicole Rodriguez, Tami Rodriguez and Milica Fajgelj.
