= Glitter in the Air =

Single by Pink

from the album Funhouse
- Released: January 31, 2010
- Recorded: 2008
- Studio: Magic Shop (New York City)
- Genre: Pop
- Length: 3:46
- Label: LaFace; Jive
- Songwriters: Alecia Moore; Billy Mann
- Producer: Billy Mann

Pink singles chronology
"I Don't Believe You" (2009)	"Glitter in the Air" (2010)	"Raise Your Glass" (2010)

"Glitter in the Air" is a song recorded by American singer Pink for her fifth studio album Funhouse (2008). It was written by Pink and Billy Mann, with the latter producing it. The song is a pop ballad with a soft piano accompaniment and drum beats. Its lyrics discuss the power of love and taking a leap of faith, while using various metaphors. The song was released as the sixth and final North American single from Funhouse on January 31, 2010, by LaFace Records and Jive Records.

"Glitter in the Air" received mixed reviews from music critics: some named it the best vocal performance of Funhouse, while others criticized it for being a cliché ballad. It debuted and peaked at number 18 on the US Billboard Hot 100, marking the first time Pink had five singles from one album enter the chart. The song was notably performed as part of Pink's Funhouse Tour (2009), with her wearing a bodysuit and doing acrobatics using aerial tissue. Pink similarly performed it at the 52nd Annual Grammy Awards (2010), where the performance was universally acclaimed by critics, and during The Truth About Love Tour (2013–2014) and the Beautiful Trauma World Tour (2018–2019).

== Music and lyrics ==
"Glitter in the Air"
A sample of the song, in which Pink sings the chorus.

"Glitter in the Air" is a pop ballad, co-written by Pink and frequent collaborator Billy Mann, who produced the song. The song is musically similar to another ballad from Funhouse, "I Don't Believe You", as both contain a soft piano and string accompaniment. According to the sheet music published at musicnotes.com by EMI Music Publishing, "Glitter in the Air" is composed in the key of F major, with a tempo of 100 beats per minute. Pink's vocal range spans from the high-tone of B♭_{4} to the low-tone of F_{3}. Nekesa Mumbi Moody of the Associated Press commented that although the song did not display the power of Pink's vocals, "her voice is still potent, full of hurt and confusion that anyone can feel". The song's lyrics discuss the power of love and taking a leap of faith. Evan Sawdey of PopMatters said the song "reflect[s] on life's simple joys and simply savor[es] them just for what they are".

== Critical reception ==
Evan Sawdey of PopMatters said, "Of all the ballads, though, the quiet piano closer 'Glitter in the Air' takes the cake, never once overplaying its hand, remaining sweet without once ever succumbing to saccharine niceties (think of a Jason Robert Brown song without the vocal showboating). It's the sweetest moment on the entire disc, but it only succeeds because it's also the least complex song here". Craig Emonds of The South End stated that while "every song has potential to do well and is quite likable, [...] Pink's vocals are strong and shine particularly in the ballad 'Glitter In The Air'." Nekesa Mumbi Moodoy of the Associated Press said that "What makes the song so moving is that despite all of the heartache, she doesn't appear gun-shy about taking the leap again".

Justin Pacheco of The Good 5 Cent Cigar compared it to "I Don't Believe You", saying, "[it] exemplifies the sappy ballad [...] and would not seem out of place being sung by any other big pop singer. 'Glitter in the Air' is another big pop ballad along the same the same lines". Patrick Ferrucci of the New Haven Register commented in the album review that "She does get a little wishy-washy though, going from tunes like 'Mean' and 'It's All Your Fault' to 'Please Don't Leave Me' and 'Glitter in the Air'". He also added that the high points of Funhouse were the four tracks produced by Max Martin. Jonathan Keefe of Slant Magazine stated that one of the biggest problems in Funhouse was its songwriting, saying, "'Glitter in the Air,' with its emo-esque "You called me sugar" bridge, is overwrought with its clichéd imagery".

== Commercial performance ==
In the United States, "Glitter in the Air" impacted radio stations as a new single minutes after Pink's performance at the 52nd Annual Grammy Awards on January 31, 2010. On February 11, the song debuted at number 18 on the Billboard Hot 100, with digital download sales of over 114,000 units. It became the fifth single from Funhouse to enter the chart, thus marking most charting singles from one of Pink's albums. The song also received significant airplay on adult contemporary radio, peaking at number eight on the Adult Top 40, becoming her fourth top-ten hit from Funhouse on the chart. In Canada, the song debuted at number 13 on the Canadian Hot 100.

== Live performances ==
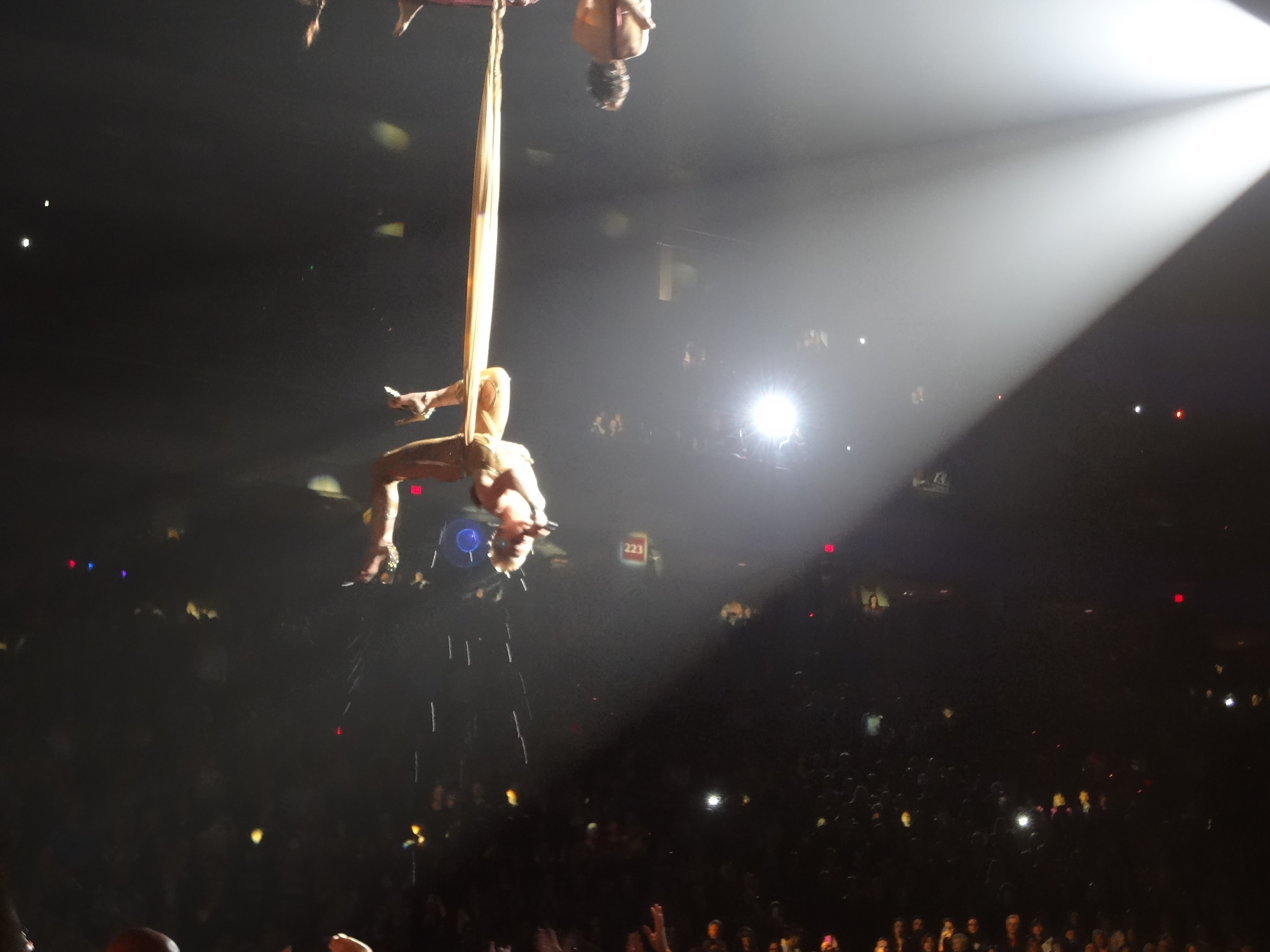
Pink performing "Glitter in the Air" at her The Truth About Love Tour, similar to her 52nd Grammy Awards performance

"Glitter in the Air" was performed by Pink on her 2009 Funhouse Tour. After the first encore of the tour–"Get the Party Started" from Missundaztood–Pink returned to the stage wearing a black robe, as glitter fell from the ceiling. Pink would begin singing while walking to the center of the runway extension of the stage. There, she took off the robe to reveal a white leotard and joined three female acrobats covered in glitter on suspension rigging which then lifted into the air. Pink continued through the song, twirling in suspended fabric above the audience. Underneath her, the acrobats performed, according to Jon Pareles of The New York Times, "slow-motion, geometric Cirque du Soleil poses". The apparatus dropped her into a tank of water and lifted her again to the air, before descending her at the end of the performance. Michael Menachem of Billboard commented, "When Pink finally touched down, she continued singing with bombast, as though the entire spectacle had been no sweat. If the rest of the show hadn't already made the case that Pink has one of the best pop-rock voices—and the most brazen moves—of her generation of stars, this final moment certainly did".

On January 31, 2010, Pink performed the song at the 52nd Grammy Awards in a similar fashion. She began the performance walking out in a white silk robe, standing in front of a backdrop of electric blue screens. She descended into the aisle and took off the robe to reveal the bodysuit. After being lifted from the tank of water, Pink kept twirling and spreading water into all directions, before finally descending to the main stage. The audience greeted her with a standing ovation. The performance was deemed by various media outlets as the best of the ceremony. Glenn Gamboa of Newsday commented, "With her stunning Grammy performance of 'Glitter in the Air,' Pink proved that you don’t have to be shocking or over-the-top to be the best or the most-talked-about. You just have to be amazing." It was also voted on a readers' poll in MTV.com as the best performance of the night. Staff reporter Kyle Anderson said "It's easy to see why, as her acrobatic performance of 'Glitter in the Air' was not only visually gorgeous, but also technically impressive — she was able to keep singing even as she was spinning around in the air". Pink later explained she had almost fallen during the song, saying, "When I do it on tour, I don't have lights above me. There were lights above me, so it almost went into a strobe thing, and I actually did get a little turned around. I thought... I was going to fall on my nude butt. But I worked it out." In 2013, Brad Wete for Billboard ranked the performance as the best performance at the Grammy Awards from 2000 to 2012, commenting it "graceful, show-stopping performance of aerial, acrobatic and vocal brilliance."

== Appearances in other media ==
- Pretty Little Liars - Episode: "A Person of Interest" and “Til Death Do Us Part”
- The Game - Episode: "Trashbox"
- Chase (Used in a promotional trailer)
- Glee - Episode: "The Untitled Rachel Berry Project" as sung by Rachel Berry (Lea Michele)
- The Voice - performed by Emily Luther in the Knockouts in Season 13 of the Voice
- The Voice - performed by Gihanna Zoë in the Knockouts in Season 20 of the Voice

== Track listing ==
- Digital download (live version)
1. "Glitter in the Air" (live at the 52nd Annual Grammy Awards) – 5:11
2. "Glitter in the Air" (live at the 52nd Annual Grammy Awards) (music video) – 5:11
- Digital download (original version)
1. "Glitter in the Air" (album version) – 3:46
2. "Glitter in the Air" (live from Australia) – 5:15

== Charts ==
=== Weekly charts ===
Weekly chart performance for "Glitter in the Air"
Chart (2010)	Peak position
Canada Hot 100 (Billboard)	13
Mexico (Billboard Ingles Airplay)	45
US Billboard Hot 100	18
US Adult Contemporary (Billboard)	19
US Adult Pop Airplay (Billboard)	8

=== Year-end charts ===
Year-end chart performance for "Glitter in the Air"
Chart (2010)	Peak position
US Adult Contemporary (Billboard)	44
US Adult Top 40 (Billboard)	29

== Certifications and sales ==
Certifications and sales for "Glitter in the Air"
Region	Certification	Certified units/sales
Australia (ARIA)	Gold	35,000^{‡}
Canada (Music Canada)	Platinum	80,000^{‡}
United States	—	699,000
^{‡} Sales+streaming figures based on certification alone.

== Release history ==
Release dates and formats for "Glitter in the Air"
Region	Date	Version(s)	Format(s)	Label(s)	Ref.
United States	January 31, 2010	Original	Radio airplay	LaFace; Jive	
United States	February 1, 2010	Live	Digital download	LaFace; Jive	
United States	June 15, 2010	Original	Digital download	LaFace; Jive	
