= Funhouse (song) =

2009 single by Pink

Single by Pink

from the album Funhouse
- Released: July 2, 2009
- Recorded: 2008
- Studio: 3:20 (Los Feliz, California); Henson (Los Angeles)
- Genre: Funk rock
- Length: 3:24
- Label: LaFace
- Songwriters: Pink, Tony Kanal, Jimmy Harry
- Producers: Tony Kanal, Jimmy Harry

Pink singles chronology
"Bad Influence" (2009)	"Funhouse" (2009)	"I Don't Believe You" (2009)

Music video
- "Funhouse" on YouTube

"Funhouse" is a song recorded by American singer Pink for her fifth studio album of the same title (2008). It was written by Pink alongside its producers Jimmy Harry and Tony Kanal. Lyrically, the song discusses Pink's separation from Carey Hart. It was released as the fourth single worldwide and fifth Australian single from Funhouse on July 2, 2009, by LaFace Records.

== Critical reception ==
Billboard gave "Funhouse" a positive review, writing: "Pink again displays her versatility on this complex number, which calls for blues, funk and rock vocal stylings that few other pop stars could pull off. The singer delivers with full force, colliding with lively guitar licks and hints of synth" and giving it an 81% approval.

== Commercial performance ==
In the United States, "Funhouse" failed to replicate the commercial success of its predecessors. It debuted at number 97 on the Billboard Hot 100 chart dated October 10, 2009, and peaked at number 44 in its sixth week, spending a total of 13 weeks charting. In Canada, the song debuted at number 80 on the Canadian Hot 100 chart dated September 12, peaking at number 21 in its seventh week.

In Australia, "Funhouse" became Pink's 16th top-ten single by peaking at number six on the ARIA Top 100 Singles chart dated August 2. The song also became Pink's fifth consecutive number-one single on the Australian Airplay Chart. In New Zealand, it debuted at number 18 on August 3, and peaked at number 15. In the United Kingdom, "Funhouse" first appeared on the UK Singles Chart at number 155 on July 5, and went on to peak at number 29.

== Music video ==
The music video was directed by Dave Meyers and premiered on June 20, 2009, in the United Kingdom on 4music at 11:00am. Tony Kanal of No Doubt, also the co-writer and the producer of the song, appears in a cameo, playing a piano. The video takes place in a barren lot that is later shown to be what's left of a house that is still burning. There are 'evil clowns' throughout the area who are picking though the rubble and playing the instruments as the band. The video begins as it pans low to the ground showing an "Elvis" grave briefly. Pink emerges from an old empty pool and begins to sing the first verse. She proceeds to kick over a toilet and picks up a framed photo. She throws it behind her. She passes a toaster and now it shows that she is in a burning fun house. She dances past a few 'evil clowns'. It shows more of the burning remains of the building. She picks up a stick and throws it down. Then an 'evil clown' turns around and the camera has a close up of its face. She counts down from 9. (She quickly shows her middle finger on '5' but on most versions of the video that is blurred out.) She moves to a table and takes a sip of some red liquid but becomes disgusted and throws it down. She jumps onto a mattress attached to a chain which two 'evil clowns' are pulling. She gets off the mattress and climbs onto the burning fun house. It shows four 'evil clowns' (Two are miming with each other, one is playing the guitar and the last is just standing on its own.) She goes over to the guitar playing clown and dances with it. She proceeds to count down from 9 again. She climbs through a doggie door to find Tony Kanal playing the piano. Pink moves to a motorcycle and puts on sunglasses and a leather jacket. In the background a voice is counting down from 9. At one she rides away on the motorcycle as the house explodes. It then shows her riding her motorcycle on a road as the song ends. In the music video, Pink wore a white tank top with white skinny jeans with black boots.

=== The Funhouse Freakshow Edition ===
As a part of the Funhouse Freakshow, alternate videos for "Funhouse", "Please Don't Leave Me" and "Leave Me Alone (I'm Lonely)" were shot.

The video for "Funhouse" directed by Cole Walliser shows Pink singing onstage along with a band consisting of clowns and the staff of a circus. She wears the same outfit that appears on the cover of "Glitter in the Air". The video is entirely shot in black and white, and it's the only one, among the Funhouse Freakshow videos where Pink lip-syncs the words of the song. The video appears on the bonus DVD accompanying the deluxe edition of Pink's compilation album, Greatest Hits... So Far!!!.

== Track listings and formats ==
CD single

1. "Funhouse" (album version) – 3:24
2. "Funhouse" (Digital Dog Remix) – 5:57

Digital single

1. "Funhouse" (album version) – 3:24
2. "Funhouse" (Digital Dog Remix) – 5:57
3. "Funhouse" (Digital Dog Dub) – 6:07

== Charts ==
=== Weekly charts ===
Weekly chart performance for "Funhouse"
Chart (2009–2010)	Peak position
Australia (ARIA)	6
Austria (Ö3 Austria Top 40)	7
Belgium (Ultratop 50 Flanders)	22
Belgium (Ultratop 50 Wallonia)	17
Canada Hot 100 (Billboard)	21
Canada CHR/Top 40 (Billboard)	39
Canada Hot AC (Billboard)	3
CIS Airplay (TopHit)	97
Croatia Intenrnational Airplay (HRT)	6
Denmark (Tracklisten)	32
France (SNEP) Download Chart	32
Germany (GfK)	16
Hungary (Rádiós Top 40)	6
Hungary (Single Top 40)	6
Ireland (IRMA)	26
Netherlands (Dutch Top 40)	14
Netherlands (Single Top 100)	54
New Zealand (Recorded Music NZ)	15
Poland (Polish Airplay Chart)	3
Scotland (OCC)	9
Sweden (Sverigetopplistan)	13
Switzerland (Schweizer Hitparade)	8
UK Singles (OCC)	29
US Billboard Hot 100	44
US Pop Airplay (Billboard)	22

=== Year-end charts ===
2009 year-end chart performance for "Funhouse"
Chart (2009)	Position
Australia (ARIA)	52
Austria (Ö3 Austria Top 40)	56
Croatia International Airplay (HRT)	33
Germany (Media Control GfK)	82
Hungary (Rádiós Top 40)	57
Netherlands (Dutch Top 40)	83

2010 year-end chart performance for "Funhouse"
Chart (2010)	Position
Hungary (Rádiós Top 40)	51

== Certifications ==
Certifications and sales for "Funhouse"
Region	Certification	Certified units/sales
Australia (ARIA)	2× Platinum	140,000^{‡}
Canada (Music Canada)	Platinum	80,000^{‡}
New Zealand (RMNZ)	Platinum	30,000^{‡}
United Kingdom (BPI)	Silver	200,000^{‡}
United States	—	743,000
^{‡} Sales+streaming figures based on certification alone.

== Release history ==
Release dates and formats for "Funhouse"
Region	Date	Format(s)	Label(s)	Ref.
United States	July 2, 2009	Digital download	LaFace	
United Kingdom	August 3, 2009	CD	RCA	
Australia	August 7, 2009	CD	Sony Music	
Germany	August 14, 2009	CD	Sony Music	
