= Please Don't Leave Me =

2009 single by Pink

Single by Pink

from the album Funhouse
- Released: February 16, 2009
- Studio: Decibel, Maratone (Stockholm, Sweden)
- Genre: Pop
- Length: 3:51
- Label: LaFace
- Songwriters: Pink; Max Martin
- Producer: Max Martin

Pink singles chronology
| "Sober" (2008) | "Please Don't Leave Me" (2009) | "Bad Influence" (2009) |

Music video
- "Please Don't Leave Me" on YouTube

"Please Don't Leave Me" is a song from American singer Pink and the third single taken from her fifth studio album Funhouse. It was released on February 16, 2009. The song received strong airplay in Australia and New Zealand, as well as being added to the BBC Radio 1 A-List playlist in the UK. The music video for "Please Don't Leave Me" was directed by Dave Meyers and was leaked online, along with the single's cover art, before the song's official announcement as a single. In the United States, the song managed to reach the top 20, peaking at #17.

== Background ==
"Please Don't Leave Me" was co-written by Pink and Max Martin, who also handled the track's production. It is one of four songs from the album produced by Max Martin, along with the number-one single "So What". The song is a mid-tempo track that details a love-hate relationship. Pink sings of someone having a bad effect on her, yet not being able to let go of the person. She insists during the chorus, "I always say how I don't need you, but it's always gonna come right back to this, please don't leave me." The song was one of the first three to be heard and performed from Funhouse, being performed along with "So What" and second single, "Sober", live on Much Music prior to the album's release.

== Reception ==
=== Critical reception ===
Digital Spy gave the song a positive review: "A really good video can make you realise a song's better than you originally thought — a case in point being the new Pink single. Within the context of her Funhouse album, 'Please Don't Leave Me' seemed like a quite good angsty break-up song — one of many quite good angsty break-up songs on there — but after watching the Misery-inspired promo it becomes something far more memorable. "I can be so mean when I wanna be, I am capable of really anything," sings Pink here, one of several lines that resonate harder once you've seen her brandishing a golf club, chucking her invalid boyfriend out of his wheelchair and chasing him round the house with an axe. Still, entertaining as the video is, it's Pink's bruised vocals — which convey the combination of bitterness and regret in her lyrics perfectly — that leave the biggest impression."

=== Chart performance ===
"Please Don't Leave Me" made a #46 debut on the Australian ARIA Charts the chart week of January 19, 2010. On the Official Australian Airplay chart, the song debuted at #8, making it the second-highest debut song ever on the chart behind Delta Goodrem's "In This Life", which debuted at #6 in September 2007. In its third week on the Airplay Chart, it managed to peak at #1, making it Pink's third consecutive single to do so, and making it the first song to peak at #1 in that many weeks. In the UK, it debuted at #162 on November 2, 2008, due to the downloads of the song from its parent album (Funhouse), which was newly released that week. In New Zealand, the song debuted at number 28 on February 23, 2009, and has peaked at number 19. The song peaked at number one in Poland. In the United Kingdom, the song re-entered the chart at #171 on March 15, 2009 due to digital sales from Funhouse, and reached a new peak of number 12, making it her 17th top twenty hit in the UK. "Please Don't Leave Me" climbed relatively slowly after its release in the United States, but after weeks of release spent on the Bubbling Under Hot 100 Chart, the song debuted on #66 on the Billboard Hot 100 and peaked at #17, giving Pink her third top 20 hit from Funhouse, as well as her sixth consecutive top 20 on the chart. The song sold well digitally, entering the Hot Digital Songs chart at #70 and rising 26 spots to #44 the following week.

== Music video ==
=== Background ===
The music video for "Please Don't Leave Me" was shot in late 2008, leaked to the internet on January 23, 2009, and officially premiered on Pink's YouTube channel on January 27, 2009. It was directed by Dave Meyers. The video draws influences from the 1990 Stephen King based film Misery, as well as other similar thrillers, including Cujo, The Shining and What Ever Happened to Baby Jane?. It utilizes both the horror/thriller genre, while also being interpretable as a dark comedy. In the week beginning February 27, the video was named Channel V's 'Ripe' clip of the week. The male lead in the video was portrayed by actor Eric Lively. Brian Christensen served as stunt coordinator, Nikki Hester as stunt double for Pink, and Justin Sundquist as stunt double for Eric Lively. The music video first aired on UK television on 4Music on March 8, 2009, at 10:45pm. It showed the full video uncensored.

=== Synopsis ===
The video begins inside Pink's house, where after a fight with her boyfriend, she is shown trying to stop him from packing up in preparation to leave. He exits the bedroom with his bags, and as he reaches the stairway, Pink pleads with him to stay. He refuses and turns to leave. As he does so, he slips on some marbles on the floor and endures a rough fall down the stairs. He sees Pink coming towards him down the stairs, with an innocent expression on her face, and blacks out. He awakens, bruised and swollen in bed with Pink dressed in a nursing type of uniform, stitching up one of his wounds. She dances suggestively for him, while he tries to grasp for the telephone at the bedside, only to have Pink smash his kneecaps with a golf club (a direct imitation of one of the scenes from the aforementioned movie Misery).

Pink pushing her boyfriend, while he is in a wheelchair, dressed as a clown

Pink is then shown in the kitchen preparing a salad, rapidly and angrily chopping the vegetables with a large knife. Her boyfriend awakens in bed, and attempts to sneak out through the door, but Pink catches him at the doorway. She gives him a bewildered look while holding the bowl of salad, as he debates whether or not he can escape. He opens the door, only to be instantly attacked by one of Pink's dogs. He is next shown opening his eyes to Pink's face yet again, as she paints his face with clownish makeup, while he sits in a wheelchair. She is wearing another lavish outfit. His hands are tied, and he is bruised and battered almost beyond recognition. Pink grabs his wheelchair, spins it around a few times and pushes it off a high step, seeming to enjoy herself in the process. He flies out of the chair into a room filled with carnival-themed objects, such as horses used in a merry-go-round and various dolls. Pink lies on top of him, acting completely innocent, and kisses his cheek.

He manages to crawl out from under and begins to attempt another escape. Pink chases him into the garage, where she grabs an axe and continues to stalk him through the house. He reaches the upstairs bathroom and shuts the door just in time to block Pink charging psychotically down the hallway with the axe. The axe breaks through the wood, leaving a hole in the door. Pink looks in through the hole (a direct imitation from the Stephen King-based film The Shining) as the man grabs a spray can, spraying her in the eyes. Blinded, she flails backwards, and slips on the marbles from the beginning of the video, falling over the upstairs railing. The final scene shows the paramedics taking the man out on a stretcher, and Pink lying on the floor with her leg broken and the axe beside her. As a police officer prepares to arrest her, she gives her boyfriend one final look of desperation not to leave as he is wheeled out, before blowing a kiss to the camera with a comically psychotic look on her face.

=== Censored version ===
Because of the video's violent and disturbing imagery of physical abuse, an edited ("censored") version has been released, which cuts roughly 11 seconds of footage, but includes some footage not previously used. The censored version does not focus on Pink's boyfriend falling down the stairs, but instead shows Pink at the top of the stairs with her mouth open, as though in shock. When he is in the bed, the sewn stitches on his arm do not appear. The scene of Pink hitting his leg with the golf club is removed. Afterward, it cuts to Pink chopping vegetables a few seconds earlier than the original and the scene is prolonged a few seconds longer. When the boyfriend tries to escape through the front door and the dog jumps on him, his cuts and blood are censored. Also, the dog isn't shown attacking him. When the boyfriend is in the wheelchair, the scene of Pink punching his right arm is cut. Instead, only her face is displayed. Pink twirls him in his wheelchair instead of pushing him. Pink isn't seen holding the axe as she chases him. Instead, the camera focuses on the boyfriend going through the house, looking back and trying to get away from her. In the bathroom scene, Pink chopping a hole in the door with the axe is cut. We see Pink through the hole in the door, but she isn't shown sprayed with the aerosol. Next, Pink slips on marbles, flips over the railings and lands on her back on the floor, as shown in the unedited version.

=== The Funhouse Freakshow Edition ===
With the release of Pink's compilation album Greatest Hits... So Far!!!, videos for "Please Don't Leave Me," "Funhouse," and "Leave Me Alone (I'm Lonely)" were released. The videos are a part of Funhouse Freakshow and were first played on Funhouse Summer Carnival Tour. The video for "Please Don't Leave Me" directed by Cole Walliser features Pink's husband Carey Hart and just like the other two videos, it is shot in black and white and the setting is a circus. Pink plays the role of a beautiful woman who is searching for a man. Men line up outside the circus tent to see her and try to gain her love. The last man in the line is as short as a child and is laughed at by the other guys. It is revealed later in the video that Hart plays the role of this man, who eventually gains Pink's love. He proposes to her, offers her a ring and she accepts it. The couple is shown on a date, then they play in the park and the video ends with Pink and Hart, as a little man, walking away together.

== Track listings ==
All tracks written by Pink and Max Martin.

UK CD single
| No. | Title | Producer(s) | Length |
|---|---|---|---|
| 1. | "Please Don't Leave Me" (radio edit) | Max Martin | 3:51 |
| 2. | "Please Don't Leave Me" (Junior Vasquez Tribal dub) | Martin; Junior Vasquez^{[a]} | 8:08 |

German CD single
| No. | Title | Producer(s) | Length |
|---|---|---|---|
| 1. | "Please Don't Leave Me" (radio edit) | Max Martin | 3:51 |
| 2. | "Please Don't Leave Me" (Junior Vasquez Tribal dub) | Martin; Vasquez^{[a]} | 8:08 |
| 3. | "Please Don't Leave Me" | Martin; Digital Dog^{[a]} | 6:33 |
| 4. | "Please Don't Leave Me" (music video) | | 4:03 |

Notes

- ^{^[a]} signifies additional producer(s)

== Charts ==
=== Weekly charts ===
Weekly chart performance for "Please Don't Leave Me"
| Chart (2009) | Peak position |
|---|---|
| Australia (ARIA) | 11 |
| Austria (Ö3 Austria Top 40) | 5 |
| Belgium (Ultratop 50 Flanders) | 31 |
| Belgium (Ultratop 50 Wallonia) | 18 |
| Canada Hot 100 (Billboard) | 8 |
| Canada AC (Billboard) | 2 |
| Canada CHR/Top 40 (Billboard) | 12 |
| Canada Hot AC (Billboard) | 1 |
| CIS Airplay (TopHit) Dogfull Radio Remix | 89 |
| Croatia International Airplay (HRT) | 4 |
| Czech Republic Airplay (ČNS IFPI) | 3 |
| Denmark (Tracklisten) | 14 |
| European Hot 100 (Billboard) | 17 |
| Finland (Suomen virallinen lista) | 17 |
| Germany (GfK) | 8 |
| Hungary (Rádiós Top 40) | 2 |
| Ireland (IRMA) | 10 |
| Italy (FIMI) | 5 |
| Netherlands (Dutch Top 40) | 19 |
| Netherlands (Single Top 100) | 48 |
| New Zealand (Recorded Music NZ) | 19 |
| Norway (VG-lista) | 16 |
| Romania Airplay (Media Forest) | 2 |
| Scottish Singles Sales (Official Charts) | 6 |
| Sweden (Sverigetopplistan) | 16 |
| Switzerland (Schweizer Hitparade) | 9 |
| UK Singles (Official Charts) | 12 |
| US Billboard Hot 100 | 17 |
| US Adult Contemporary (Billboard) | 5 |
| US Adult Pop Airplay (Billboard) | 2 |
| US Pop Airplay (Billboard) | 6 |

=== Year-end charts ===
2009 year-end chart performance for "Please Don't Leave Me"
| Chart (2009) | Position |
|---|---|
| Australia (ARIA) | 63 |
| Austria (Ö3 Austria Top 40) | 33 |
| Canada (Canadian Hot 100) | 23 |
| Croatia International Airplay (HRT) | 16 |
| Netherlands (Dutch Top 40) | 99 |
| Germany (Media Control GfK) | 53 |
| Hungary (Rádiós Top 40) | 22 |
| Sweden (Sverigetopplistan) | 48 |
| Switzerland (Schweizer Hitparade) | 45 |
| UK Singles (OCC) | 92 |
| US Billboard Hot 100 | 52 |
| US Adult Contemporary (Billboard) | 18 |
| US Adult Top 40 (Billboard) | 4 |
| US Mainstream Top 40 (Billboard) | 31 |

2010 year-end chart performance for "Please Don't Leave Me"
| Chart (2010) | Position |
|---|---|
| US Adult Contemporary (Billboard) | 12 |

== Certifications ==
Certifications for "Please Don't Leave Me"
| Region | Certification | Certified units/sales |
|---|---|---|
| Australia (ARIA) | 3× Platinum | 210,000^{‡} |
| Austria (IFPI Austria) | Gold | 15,000^{*} |
| Brazil (Pro-Música Brasil) | Gold | 30,000^{‡} |
| Canada (Music Canada) | 2× Platinum | 160,000^{‡} |
| Denmark (IFPI Danmark) | Gold | 15,000^{^} |
| Germany (BVMI) | Gold | 150,000^{‡} |
| New Zealand (RMNZ) | Platinum | 30,000^{‡} |
| Switzerland (IFPI Switzerland) | Gold | 15,000^{^} |
| United Kingdom (BPI) | Platinum | 600,000^{‡} |
| United States | — | 1,318,000 |
^{*} Sales figures based on certification alone.^{^} Shipments figures based on certification alone.^{‡} Sales+streaming figures based on certification alone.

== Release history ==
Release dates and formats for "Please Don't Leave Me"
| Region | Date | Format | Label | Ref. |
|---|---|---|---|---|
| Australia | February 16, 2009 | CD single | Sony | |
| United States | March 31, 2009 | Contemporary hit radio | LaFace | |
| Germany | April 17, 2009 | CD single | Sony | |
