= I Don't Believe You =

2009 single by Pink

Single by Pink

from the album Funhouse
- Released: October 5, 2009
- Recorded: 2008
- Studio: Decibel Studios (Stockholm, Sweden); House of Blues Studios (Encino, California); Maratone Studios (Stockholm, Sweden)
- Genre: Soft rock
- Length: 4:36 (album version); 3:50 (radio edit)
- Label: LaFace
- Songwriters: Pink; Max Martin
- Producer: Max Martin

Pink singles chronology
"Funhouse" (2009)	"I Don't Believe You" (2009)	"Glitter in the Air" (2010)

Music video
- "I Don't Believe You" on YouTube

Audio sample
- A sample of the song, in which Pink sings the chorus: file; help

"I Don't Believe You" is a song by American recording artist Pink. It was released as the sixth single from her fifth studio album, Funhouse.

== Music and lyrics ==
"I Don't Believe You" is set in common time and played in the key of A-flat major. The guitar and piano are used for the background music, while Pink's voice follows the A♭ —Fm7—Cm—D♭—A♭ chord progression. Pink explained on her website that, lyrically, the song is about pleading for reconciliation, and is her favourite song from Funhouse "because it's just so naked. It's like taking a deep breathe and saying, 'Here I am. Take me. Take your best shot'." She went on to explain that:

"The first thing that comes to my mind with I Don't Believe You is me standing in the vocal booth listening... Actually in the control room listening to this song, tears running down my face, just like 'fuck, really?' It's the vulnerable weak side of me that I don't let out very often. And it's [sighs], yeah it's that song. And I love it, I love it. I just love it, it's very near and dear to me."

== Critical reception ==
Jonathan Keefe from Slant Magazine praised the song, notably its sparse electric guitar riff and Pink's "phenomenal vocal turn that is both vulnerable and accusatory", while New York Times reporter Jon Caramanica claimed "I Don't Believe You" swells like a classic soul ballad, as Pink pleads for a lover to reconsider walking away. On another side, Christian Hoard of Rolling Stone magazine gave a negative review, claiming the song is a "goopy ballad", which makes the singer sound like "just another big-voiced chart-buster", and that she has shown more personality on previous singles.

== Music video ==
The music video for "I Don't Believe You", directed by Sophie Muller, was shot in September 2009 in Los Angeles, California. The music video premiered in October 2009. The video is in black and white, it features Pink in the wedding dress she wore to her actual wedding to Carey Hart in 2006, and a diamond encrusted wedding gown as she searches for her lover, to no avail. Scenes include her lying down in the dress, rollerblading around what appears to be the inside of a church (The Los Angeles Theater), singing to an empty wedding dining room, crying over an empty wedding album and singing to herself in front of the mirror.

== Live performances ==
On September 16, 2009, Pink performed "I Don't Believe You" along with "Funhouse" on Jimmy Kimmel Live! She also performed the song on February 5, 2010, on The Oprah Winfrey Show. The song was also performed on the Funhouse Tour.

== Track listing ==
Digital download and Australian CD single

1. "I Don't Believe You" (album version) – 4:35
2. "I Don't Believe You" (music video)

German CD single

1. "I Don't Believe You" (album version) – 4:35
2. "I Don't Believe You" (live in Australia) – 4:14

== Credits and personnel ==
Credits adapted from CD single line cover and Tidal.

Personnel

- Pink – songwriting, vocals
- Max Martin – songwriting, production, bass, guitar, record engineering
- Shellback – acoustic guitar, percussion
- Henrik Janson – arranger, conductor
- Ulf Janson – arranger, conductor
- Stockholm Session Strings – strings
- Al Clay – engineering
- John Hanes – engineering
- dag lundquist – engineering
- Chris Galland – assistant engineering
- Doug Tyo – assistant engineering
- Tim Roberts – assistant engineering
- Tommy Anderson – assistant engineering
- Serban Ghenea – mixing
- Tom Coyne – mastering

Management

- Pink – A&R
- Craig Logan – A&R
- Rogen Davies – management

== Charts ==
Weekly chart performance for "I Don't Believe You"
Chart (2009–2010)	Peak position
Australia (ARIA)	23
Austria (Ö3 Austria Top 40)	15
Belgium (Ultratip Bubbling Under Flanders)	7
Canada Hot 100 (Billboard)	66
CIS Airplay (TopHit)	153
Czech Republic Airplay (ČNS IFPI)	4
Denmark (Tracklisten)	36
European Hot 100 Singles (Billboard)	50
Germany (GfK)	17
Hungary (Rádiós Top 40)	31
Netherlands (Single Top 100)	70
Netherlands (Dutch Top 40)	23
Portugal Digital Song Sales (Billboard)	7
Scottish Singles Sales (Official Charts)	54
Sweden (Sverigetopplistan)	11
Switzerland (Schweizer Hitparade)	33
UK Singles (Official Charts)	62
US Bubbling Under Hot 100 (Billboard)	17

== Certifications ==
Region	Certification	Certified units/sales
Australia (ARIA)	Platinum	70,000^{‡}
Canada (Music Canada)	Gold	40,000^{‡}
^{‡} Sales+streaming figures based on certification alone.

== Release history ==
Release dates and formats for "I Don't Believe You"
Region	Date	Format(s)	Label(s)	Ref.
United States	October 5, 2009	Hot adult contemporary radio	LaFace; RCA	
Australia	October 19, 2009	Digital download	Sony Music	
United Kingdom	October 23, 2009	Digital download	LaFace	
Australia	October 26, 2009	CD	Sony Music	
United Kingdom	November 2, 2009	CD	LaFace	
Germany	November 27, 2009	CD; digital download	Sony Music	
