= Cole Walliser =

Canadian filmmaker and music video director

- Born: Vancouver, British Columbia, Canada
- Occupations: Music video director, film director
- Known for: Glambot high-speed videos
- Website: colewalliser.com

Cole Walliser (born 15 July 1981) is a Canadian filmmaker and music video director best known for directing Glambot videos on red carpets.

== Early life and education ==
Walliser was born on 15 July 1981 in Vancouver, British Columbia and grew up there and in Richmond, British Columbia. He completed a Bachelor of Arts degree in psychology from University of British Columbia.

== Career ==
In 2005, Walliser directed the short film Night & Daze which was presented at the Vancouver Asian Film Festival. In 2008, one of Walliser's dancer friends, who was a choreographer for Miley Cyrus at the time, asked him to direct two episodes of the web series The Miley and Mandy Show ("M&M Cru with a U BATTLES Step Up 2" and "M&M Cru Final Dance Battle: Cyrus Blaine Seacrest Tatum") in response to a friendly dance battle proposed by Jon Chu and Adam Sevani's dance troupe. These episodes featured dance crews and a number of celebrity cameos, culminating in a performance at the 2008 Teen Choice Awards, which Walliser also directed.

In 2016, while working the red carpet for E! Entertainment, Walliser started directing Glambot high-speed videos of celebrities posing on red carpets. He shares these videos on social media with behind-the-scenes of the setups.
