= Bad Influence (song) =

2009 single by Pink

Single by Pink

from the album Funhouse
- Released: May 4, 2009
- Recorded: 2008
- Studio: Electric Lady (New York City); Malibuddha (Malibu)
- Genre: Pop rock; reggae
- Length: 3:35
- Label: LaFace
- Songwriters: Pink; Billy Mann; Butch Walker; Robin Mortensen Lynch; Niklas Olovson
- Producers: Billy Mann; Butch Walker; MachoPsycho

Pink singles chronology
"Please Don't Leave Me" (2009)	"Bad Influence" (2009)	"Funhouse" (2009)

"Bad Influence" is a song recorded by American singer Pink for her fifth studio album Funhouse (2008). It was written by Pink alongside its producers Billy Mann, Butch Walker and MachoPsycho. The song was released as the fourth Australian single from Funhouse on May 4, 2009, by LaFace Records; it was subsequently released as the sixth and final German single from the album in March 2010.

"Bad Influence" received generally positive reviews from music critics, who complimented its lyrical content. A moderate commercial success, it peaked at number six in Australia while attaining lower positions elsewhere. In April 2011, the song was released as the third and final single from Pink's first greatest hits album Greatest Hits... So Far!!! in the Netherlands, where it reached the top 20.

== Critical reception ==
"Bad Influence" received generally positive reviews from music critics. Stephen Thomas Erlewine from AllMusic picked it as one of the best from Funhouse, stating that "the snotty stance is second nature to her, so maybe that's why Funhouse only really clicks when Pink abandons any pretense of mourning her relationship and just cuts loose with galumphing rhythms and schoolyard taunts, the kind that fuel 'Bad Influence' and make it instantly indelible." Joan Anderman from The Boston Globe agreed, writing: "It is a signature track, a fully cranked, reggae-flecked party tune celebrating the singer's, um, leadership skills." Reed Fischer of The Village Voice noted similarities to Gwen Stefani. Lucy Davies from BBC Music described it as Pink's "L.O.V.E.-style getting-on-down-with-the-girls anthem." Anna Creech from Blogcritics commented on the lyrics, stating: "P!nk is, in many ways, fearless in her lyrics. Bristling at any perceived weakness while exposing her vulnerable side, she is "keeping it real" while also maintaining a healthy sense of humor."

On the contrary, Andy Battaglia from The A.V. Club gave "Bad Influence" a negative review, commenting: "It represents the worst of the album, with a pleased-as-punch inventory of Pink's own rebelliousness and a circus-like sound that claims to have some explanation for what it means to be 'the instigator of underwear'." Spencer D. from IGN also criticized the song, writing that it showcased Pink "sounding an awful lot like late 1990s PacNorWest Alt Rock darlings Harvey Danger, at least in terms of her cadence and vocal buoyancy."

== Commercial performance ==
In Australia, "Bad Influence" debuted at number 28 on the ARIA Top 100 Singles, peaking at number six in its eighth week. It was certified double platinum by the Australian Recording Industry Association (ARIA) in 2023. In New Zealand, the song debuted at number 33 and peaked at number 12 in its sixth week.

In the United Kingdom, "Bad Influence" entered the UK Singles Chart at number 161 in October 2009, despite not being released as a single, and peaked at number 123. In Germany, it reached number 26, while topping the airplay chart. In the Netherlands, the song peaked at number 13 on the Dutch Top 40 following its April 2011 release as a Greatest Hits... So Far!!! single.

== Track listings and formats ==
Australian and German CD single and digital download

1. "Bad Influence" – 3:35
2. "Please Don't Leave Me" (Digital Dog Radio Edit) – 3:43

== Charts ==
=== Weekly charts ===
Weekly chart performance for "Bad Influence"
Chart (2009–2011)	Peak position
Australia (ARIA)	6
Austria (Ö3 Austria Top 40)	20
Germany (GfK)	26
Germany Airplay (Official German Charts)	1
Hungary (Editors' Choice Top 40)	25
Netherlands (Dutch Top 40)	13
Netherlands (Single Top 100)	88
New Zealand (Recorded Music NZ)	12
Switzerland (Schweizer Hitparade)	44
UK Singles (OCC)	123

=== Year-end charts ===
2009 year-end chart performance for "Bad Influence"
Chart (2009)	Position
Australia (ARIA)	56

2011 year-end chart performance for "Bad Influence"
Chart (2011)	Position
Netherlands (Dutch Top 40)	78

== Certifications ==
Certifications and sales for "Bad Influence"
Region	Certification	Certified units/sales
Australia (ARIA)	2× Platinum	140,000^{‡}
^{‡} Sales+streaming figures based on certification alone.

== Release history ==
Release dates and formats for "Bad Influence"
Region	Date	Format(s)	Label(s)	Ref.
Australia	May 4, 2009	CD	Sony Music	
Australia	May 8, 2009	Digital download	Sony Music	
Germany	March 26, 2010	CD	Sony Music	
Netherlands	April 11, 2011	Contemporary hit radio	Sony Music	
