= Sober (Pink song) =

2008 single by Pink

Single by Pink

from the album Funhouse
- B-side: "When We're Through"
- Released: November 10, 2008
- Recorded: 2008
- Studio: Sha Recording (Malibu, California); 3:20 (Los Feliz, California); Henson (Los Angeles)
- Genre: Rock; power pop
- Length: 4:11
- Label: LaFace
- Songwriters: Pink; Nate "Danja" Hills; Kara DioGuardi; Marcella Araica
- Producers: Danja; Tony Kanal; Jimmy Harry

Pink singles chronology
"So What" (2008)	"Sober" (2008)	"Please Don't Leave Me" (2009)

Music video
- "Sober" on YouTube

"Sober" is a song by the American singer-songwriter Pink, taken from her fifth studio album, Funhouse (2008). It was written by Pink and Kara DioGuardi, with additional writing by Nate "Danja" Hills and Marcella Araica, while production was done by Danja, Tony Kanal and Jimmy Harry. The song was released as the album's second single on November 10, 2008, firstly through digital download and later was added to U.S. radio stations on December 1, 2008. The rock and power pop song talks about the quiet sense of comfort in being sober, with the singer claiming it was about the vices that we choose.

The song received generally favorable reviews from music critics, who commended the track for being a heartfelt track, with some praising its lyrical content. However, few critics dismissed the track, calling it "more of the same" from her previous music. Furthermore, the song was nominated for a Grammy Award for Best Female Pop Vocal Performance in 2010. Commercially, "Sober" attained success on the charts, reaching the top-ten in over thirteen countries, while reaching the top-twenty in the U.S., as well as the top of Billboard's Adult Top 40 chart. A music video for the track was directed by Jonas Akerlund and it finds Pink at a party with her doppelgänger.

== Background and recording ==
In February 2008, Pink announced that she and her husband Carey Hart had separated, which led the singer to write songs for a new album. It was confirmed that she was working with many music producers such as Butch Walker, Billy Mann, Eg White and Danja. While working on the album, she penned a track called "Sober" with Kara DioGuardi, claiming it was "about the vices that we choose." She added, "I had this idea in my head, 'like how do I feel this good sober?' So I brought that idea to Danja and with this awesome girl Kara DioGuardi and we wrote this song, Sober. And it's a pretty telling song and then me and Tony Kanal and Jimmy Harry finished it, production-wise, threw some strings on it and made it a little bit darker and a little bit more rocky." Danja and Marcella Araica contributed to additional lyrics, with Danja, Kanal and Harry serving as the producers of the song. Araica, Harry and Jake Davis recorded the track at Sha Recording (Malibu, California), 3:20 Studios (Los Feliz, Los Angeles) and Henson Recording Studios (Los Angeles, California). Stevie Blacke arranged and performed all the strings, Jimmy Harry was also responsible for guitars and keyboards, while Tony Kanal provided bass.

== Release ==
"Sober" was selected to be Funhouse's second single, after the huge success of "So What". It received airplay before release in Australia on Today Network's stations and the Hot 30 Countdown and was the number one most added song on Australian radio. It was sent to contemporary hit radio in the United States on December 1, 2008. While announced its release on her official website, Pink claimed, "It’s just a really, really personal beautiful song, one of my favorites.” While reviewing the single, Alex Fletcher wrote for Digital Spy that the song is "a dramatic U-turn from the brash and ballsy single 'So What', but reiterated that "it's a better representation of her 'Funhouse' album" than its lead single." Slant's Jonathan Keefe disagreed, calling it an "oddly-chosen second single."

== Composition and lyrics ==
"Sober" is a rock and power pop song, featuring heavy guitars and booming snare. In the song, Pink's vocals span from the low-note of E_{3} to the high-note of D_{5}. Lyrically, the song speaks about the quiet sense of discomfort in being sober. Lucy Davies of BBC Music went further, writing that the song "discusses the blackouts resulting from drinking to avoid becoming those she sneers at." Chris William, writing for Entertainment Weekly, commented that the song finds Pink "questioning her need to be numbed by booze and noise." Mark Blankenship of New Now Next analyzed the song, writing that it is "about a woman who only loves herself when she’s drunk, who wishes she could like herself this much when she’s sober, but who can’t seem to pull herself out of her spiral. She later discussed the song's lyrics in two interviews, stating:

I wrote a song called "Sober", which is actually really dark. I was at a party at my own house, I didn't want to be there, I didn't want anyone else there. And I had this line in my head saying, 'How do I feel this good sober?', it's not just about alcohol, it's about vices, we all have different ones. We try to get away from ourselves, and find our 'true selves' and then we do these things that take us so far from the truth, I guess that 'Sober' is 'How do I feel this good when it's just me, without anything to lean on?'.

I have had some vices in my life. When I was younger it was drugs and things and I was given the opportunity to sing … [T]he DJ woke up and said “I’ll give you a guest spot on Friday nights if you never touch drugs again.” It was Thanksgiving of ’95 and I woke up the next morning and never did another drug. I was 15 then, … when I was 21 I was like, “I like alcohol, I never knew about this.” … Then I was getting a divorce and I was drinking a lot. … So everyone was at my house, all these new friends all of sudden, and I looked around and there’s that moment when you’re drinking where you just hate everyone that’s at your house and … I was thinking, "How do I feel this good sober?" 'Cause I'd love — that's the other side of drinking. Why do we drink, you know? To be free of pain, to be free of shyness — it's like that liquid courage. So how do I find this again without this vice? … I'm not going to meet a cute anybody drunk all the time, and I'm on the market. … So I went to the studio the next day, and I thought, "Cool: I want to get drunk and write a song about sobriety. So that's what I did: ”Sober”.

== Critical reception ==
The song received generally favorable reviews from music critics. Davey Boy of Sputnikmusic called the song "a highlight that immediately follows the opener," praising her vocals, writing that they "are at her heartfelt best on this strings-assisted cut, which is sure to be a grower." Jon Dolan of Blender enjoyed the track, commenting that it "conflates the pain of love and the love of booze so convincingly that the girls from 'Lady Marmalade' might want to regroup for an intervention." Susan Yudt of Common Sense Media praised the track for "channel[ing] the buzz of a love that's all-consuming, culminating in a breathtaking string quartet coda." Evan Sawdey wrote for PopMatters that "Pink launches into the surprisingly downtrodden, a song that once again spends time convincing herself that everything’s alright."

Andy Battaglia from The A.V. Club stated that 'Sober' is "a solemn song that slinks along at a slower speed, the better to bear out the grainy range of her voice." Spence D. of IGN called it a "syncopated rhythm driven ballad," while Joan Anderman wrote for The Boston Globe that the song "finds the sweet spot between American Idol and the Red Hot Chili Peppers." Michael Cragg of musicOMH was more mixed, writing that 'Sober' and 'Please Don't Leave Me' are catchy future singles, but both tread the same I-hate-you-I-love-you path she's walked down a dozen times." In the same vein, Alex Fletcher of Digital Spy called it "not one of her most memorable singles, but [it] should find its way on to the nation's airwaves."

=== Accolades ===
"Sober" was nominated for a Grammy Award for Best Female Pop Vocal Performance in its 2010 edition, but lost it to Beyoncé's "Halo". While listing the "Top 100 Pop Songs of 2008", Bill Lamb of About.com placed the song at number 72, writing that "Pink is likely to make more than a few parents happy with the sentiments of this song celebrating the value of partying sober. She is one of the most consistent artists in the pop mainstream today." "Sober" was also on Lamb's "Top 10 Best Pink Songs" list, being ranked at number 6, while Nadine Cheung of AOL Radio also listed her "Top 10 Songs", placing it at number 5. Jessica Letkemann of Billboard ranked "P!nk's 20 Biggest Billboard Hits", with "Sober" being the 15th, being praised for its "circular guitar riff and a big backbeat." In 2012, Mark Blankenship of New Now Next put the song at number-one on her best tracks, describing that "there are many reasons that 'Sober' is my jam. For one, the lyrics are dense and satisfying. It takes more than a superficial listen to catch the nuance [of the song]. Plus, this story gets told with a thrilling rock score [...]. The 'spinning round' bridge is quiet and lovely, while the chorus is all shouts and emotion. The verses are fully of theatrical pauses and inflections, and the ending just drips with power notes. It’s amazing."

== Chart performance ==
"Sober" debuted at number 53 on the Billboard Hot 100 issue dated December 13, 2008. After falling to number 65, the song jumped to number 49. In its fourth week, the song cracked the top-forty, reaching number 34, while in its eighth week, it entered the top-twenty, reaching number 20. After weeks fluctuating on the charts, the song reached a peak of number 15 on the issue dated March 7, 2009. On other Billboard component charts, "Sober" was even more successful, reaching number 3 on the Pop Songs chart, and topping the Adult Top 40 chart, becoming her third consecutive number-one there, with "Who Knew" and "So What" being the two prior. It was also the first time an artist scored three consecutive number ones on the Adult Top 40 in the chart's history, as well as the first time a female artist has achieved three number ones on the chart. As of May 2011, "Sober" has sold over 2,037,000 downloads in the United States, becoming the second million-selling song from the Funhouse album. Elsewhere, the song became a top-ten hit in over twelve countries.

"Sober" made its debut on the Australian ARIA Singles Chart, entering at number 16 and peaking at number 6 six weeks later. In 2009, the song was certified double platinum by the Australian Recording Industry Association for shipments of over 140,000 copies. In New Zealand, the song debuted at number 35 and peaked at number 7, on December 15, 2008. In the United Kingdom, the song entered at number 80 and eventually peaked at number 9. In Austria, "Sober" peaked at number 4, and remained at its peak position for five non-consecutive weeks, while in the Netherlands, it charted higher, reaching number 2. In Canada, "Sober" debuted at number 66 and went on to peak at number 8.

== Music video ==
Pink and her doppelgänger in the bathroom at a party, in the video for "Sober"

The music video was directed by Jonas Akerlund and filmed in Stockholm, Sweden. It plays on a dream-like space between real and imagined over the course of a night. Pink hosts a party attended by a vamped up version of herself and the two quickly fall into bed, scratching and biting each other.

=== Synopsis ===
The video starts with views from the city, and then a television set is turned on in Pink's bedroom, and Pink appears in white. The song starts, and Pink is shown in the bedroom lying on the bed alone, and a girl is shown walking out of the door of the room. As the first verse starts, Pink is shown sitting on a sofa in a party where her doppelgänger is drunk and flirting with different girls and guys. Pink's doppelgänger is shown vomiting in the bathroom. Pink enters the bathroom and sits beside her doppelgänger who seems disturbed and then walks out. Pink is now lying on the bed, and her doppelgänger calls her up, but Pink does not answer her cell. As the chorus begins, Pink is shown singing on her bed in her bedroom and on the sofa in the party. And then scenes of a white room where Pink is dressed in a white outfit and wearing a white pageboy wig can be shown. The second verse is sung in the same location. As the chorus starts again, Pink is shown walking in the room where the party was held where everybody is blacked out and drunk, including her doppelgänger. As the song reaches its climax and bridge, Pink is shown having sex with her doppelgänger in bed. The scene was cut or replaced by almost all television channels. Various scenes from the video are then shown and the video ends with one of the Pinks walking out of the door of the bedroom leaving the other Pink alone. In France, the music video was broadcast with a censored version during day and an uncensored version after 10pm due to the sex scene in the middle of the video, and other disturbing scenes. The uncensored version was often accompanied by a warning Not advised to kids under 10 years old (in French : Déconseillé aux moins de 10 ans).

== Track listing ==
Single CD

1. "Sober" — 4:11
2. "When We're Through" — 4:22

Maxi CD

1. "Sober" — 4:14
2. "When We're Through" — 4:22
3. "Sober" (Bimbo Jones Radio Edit) — 3:04
4. "Sober" (Junior's Spinning Around Tribal Dub) — 9:00

== Charts ==
=== Weekly charts ===
Chart (2008–2009)	Peak position
Australia (ARIA)	6
Austria (Ö3 Austria Top 40)	4
Belgium (Ultratop 50 Flanders)	10
Belgium (Ultratop 50 Wallonia)	11
Canada Hot 100 (Billboard)	8
CIS Airplay (TopHit)	61
Croatia International Airplay (HRT)	3
Czech Republic Airplay (ČNS IFPI)	1
Denmark (Tracklisten)	14
Europe (European Hot 100 Singles)	12
Finland (Suomen virallinen lista)	8
France (SNEP)	123
France Download (SNEP)	8
Germany (GfK)	3
Germany Airplay (BVMI)	1
Hungary (Rádiós Top 40)	19
Hungary (Single Top 40)	7
Ireland (IRMA)	12
Mexico (Billboard Ingles Airplay)	4
Netherlands (Dutch Top 40)	3
Netherlands (Single Top 100)	23
New Zealand (Recorded Music NZ)	7
Scottish Singles Sales (Official Charts)	7
Slovakia Airplay (ČNS IFPI)	2
Sweden (Sverigetopplistan)	12
Switzerland (Schweizer Hitparade)	5
UK Singles (Official Charts)	9
US Billboard Hot 100	15
US Adult Contemporary (Billboard)	22
US Adult Pop Airplay (Billboard)	1
US Pop Airplay (Billboard)	3

=== Year-end charts ===
Chart (2008)	Position
Australia (ARIA)	54

Chart (2009)	Position
Australia (ARIA)	91
Austria (Ö3 Austria Top 40)	26
Belgium (Ultratop 50 Flanders)	79
Belgium (Ultratop 50 Wallonia)	56
Canada (Canadian Hot 100)	30
Croatia International Airplay (HRT)	29
European Hot 100 Singles	45
Germany (Media Control GfK)	30
Hungary (Rádiós Top 40)	4
Netherlands (Dutch Top 40)	28
Sweden (Sverigetopplistan)	90
Switzerland (Schweizer Hitparade)	21
UK Singles (OCC)	106
US Billboard Hot 100	38
US Adult Top 40 (Billboard)	8
US Mainstream Top 40 (Billboard)	17

== Certifications ==
Region	Certification	Certified units/sales
Australia (ARIA)	5× Platinum	350,000^{‡}
Austria (IFPI Austria)	Gold	15,000^{*}
Brazil (Pro-Música Brasil)	Gold	30,000^{‡}
Canada (Music Canada)	2× Platinum	160,000^{‡}
Denmark (IFPI Danmark)	Gold	7,500^{^}
Germany (BVMI)	Gold	150,000^{^}
New Zealand (RMNZ)	Platinum	30,000^{‡}
Switzerland (IFPI Switzerland)	Gold	15,000^{^}
United Kingdom (BPI)	Gold	400,000^{‡}
^{*} Sales figures based on certification alone.^{^} Shipments figures based on certification alone.^{‡} Sales+streaming figures based on certification alone.

== Release history ==
Release dates and formats for "Sober"
Region	Date	Format	Label	Ref.
Australia	November 10, 2008	Digital download	Sony BMG	
United States	December 1, 2008	Contemporary hit radio	RCA	
Germany	December 5, 2008	CD single	Sony BMG	
United Kingdom	January 19, 2009	CD single	Sony BMG	
