= Pink discography =

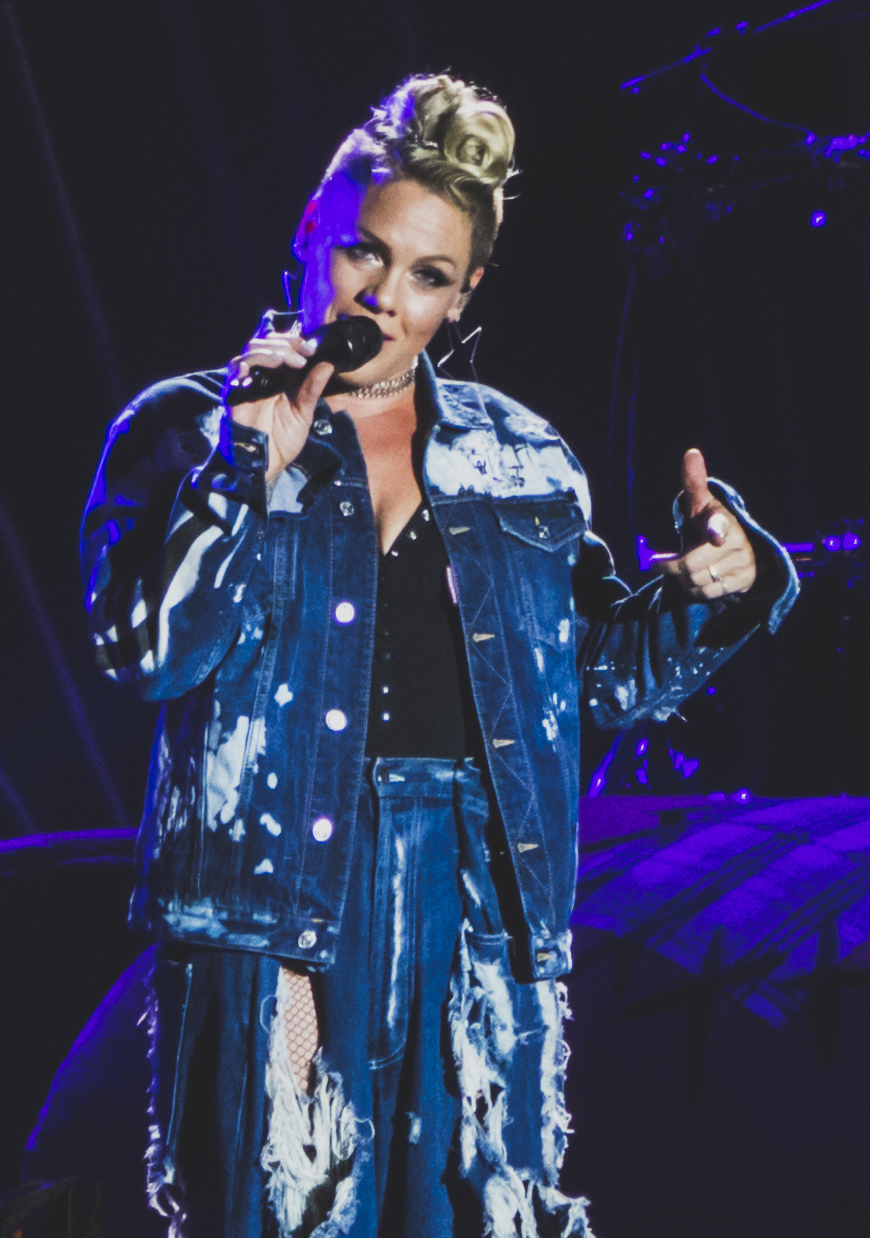
- Pink performing at a concert in 2017
- Studio albums: 9
- Live albums: 1
- Compilation albums: 6
- Singles: 59
- Music videos: 53
- Promotional singles: 9
- Collaborative albums: 1
- Video albums: 5

American singer and songwriter Pink has released nine studio albums, one live album, five video albums, six compilation albums, 59 singles (including 3 as a featured artist), three charity singles, six promotional singles, and 53 music videos. Throughout her career, Pink has sold 60 million albums, 75 million singles and 2.4 million DVDs worldwide. According to RIAA, she has sold 18 million albums and 13.5 million digital singles. She is also UK's second best-selling female artist of the 21st century. Billboard ranked her as the fifth top female artist of the 2000s (13th overall), eighth top female artist of the 2010s (18th overall) and the 59th greatest artist of all time. Official Charts Company hailed her as UK's most played female artist of the 21st century. She has also had notable success in Australia, where she has placed five albums at either number 1 or number 2 on the ARIA year-end chart. "The Truth About Love" topped the year-end chart there for 2012 and 2013 respectively, becoming the first album to do so in two consecutive years.

In 2000, she released her debut studio album, Can't Take Me Home. It has sold four million units worldwide and yielded three singles, "There You Go", "Most Girls", and "You Make Me Sick". A year later, Pink recorded the Moulin Rouge! version of "Lady Marmalade" with Christina Aguilera, Mýa, and Lil' Kim. Later that year, Pink released her second studio album, Missundaztood, which has sold 15 million copies worldwide. The record was promoted by four singles, "Get the Party Started", "Don't Let Me Get Me", "Just Like a Pill", and "Family Portrait", all of which achieved commercial success.

In 2003, Pink released her third studio album, Try This. The album was her least successful album, having sold 3 million units worldwide. Its single releases include "Trouble", "God Is a DJ", and "Last to Know". Her fourth studio album, I'm Not Dead, was released in 2006 and fared moderately on the charts. It generated seven singles, including top 10 singles "Stupid Girls", "U + Ur Hand", and "Who Knew". Pink's fifth album, Funhouse (2008), sold over seven million copies worldwide and charted at number one in several countries, including Australia, the Netherlands, and the United Kingdom. It includes her second number one hit on the Billboard Hot 100, "So What".

In 2010, Pink released her first greatest hits album, Greatest Hits... So Far!!!. It produced two top 10 hit singles, "Raise Your Glass" and "Fuckin' Perfect". Her sixth album, The Truth About Love, was released in 2012 and produced six singles, "Blow Me (One Last Kiss)", "Try", "Just Give Me a Reason", "True Love", "Walk of Shame", and "Are We All We Are". In 2017, the singer released her seventh album Beautiful Trauma, which topped the charts in Australia, Austria, Canada, Ireland, the Netherlands, New Zealand, the United Kingdom, and the United States. Its lead single "What About Us" reached number one in Australia and the Netherlands.

== Albums ==
=== Studio albums ===
List of studio albums, with selected chart positions, sales figures and certifications
Title	Album details	Peak chart positions										Sales	Certifications
Title	Album details	US	AUS	AUT	CAN	FRA	GER	NLD	NZ	SWI	UK	Sales	Certifications
Can't Take Me Home	Released: April 4, 2000; Label: LaFace, Arista; Formats: CD, LP, cassette, digital download	26	10	—	19	—	85	58	12	—	13	US: 2,300,000; UK: 486,721; CAN: 300,000	RIAA: 2× Platinum; ARIA: 2× Platinum; BPI: Platinum; MC: 2× Platinum; RMNZ: Platinum
Missundaztood	Released: November 20, 2001; Label: LaFace, Arista; Formats: CD, LP, cassette, digital download	6	14	4	5	17	5	5	4	7	2	US: 5,628,000; UK: 1,850,000	RIAA: 5× Platinum; ARIA: 4× Platinum; BPI: 6× Platinum; BVMI: 2× Platinum; IFPI AUT: Platinum; IFPI SWI: 2× Platinum; MC: 5× Platinum; NVPI: Platinum; RMNZ: 4× Platinum; SNEP: 2× Gold
Try This	Released: November 11, 2003; Label: LaFace, Arista; Formats: CD, LP, digital download	9	8	2	8	12	2	8	24	1	3	US: 724,000; UK: 554,000	RIAA: Platinum; ARIA: 2× Platinum; BPI: Platinum; BVMI: 3× Gold; IFPI AUT: Platinum; IFPI SWI: Gold; MC: Platinum; RMNZ: Gold
I'm Not Dead	Released: April 4, 2006; Label: LaFace, Zomba; Formats: CD, LP, digital download	6	1	1	2	7	1	5	1	1	3	US: 1,500,000; UK: 1,400,000	RIAA: 2× Platinum; ARIA: 12× Platinum; BPI: 4× Platinum; BVMI: 7× Gold; IFPI AUT: 2× Platinum; IFPI SWI: 2× Platinum; MC 2× Platinum; NVPI: Gold; RMNZ: 2× Platinum; SNEP: Platinum
Funhouse	Released: October 28, 2008; Label: LaFace, Zomba; Formats: CD, LP, digital download	2	1	3	3	4	2	1	1	1	1	US: 1,960,000; UK: 1,290,000	RIAA: 3× Platinum; ARIA: 13× Platinum; BPI: 4× Platinum; BVMI: 4× Platinum; IFPI AUT: 3× Platinum; IFPI SWI: 3× Platinum; MC: 4× Platinum; NVPI: Platinum; RMNZ: 4× Platinum; SNEP: Platinum
The Truth About Love	Released: September 18, 2012; Label: RCA; Formats: CD, LP, digital download	1	1	1	1	4	1	2	1	1	2	US: 1,865,000; AUS: 560,000; UK: 907,000	RIAA: 3× Platinum; ARIA: 9× Platinum; BPI: 3× Platinum; BVMI: 3× Platinum; IFPI AUT: Platinum; IFPI SWI: Platinum; MC: 6× Platinum; RMNZ: 6× Platinum; SNEP: Gold
Beautiful Trauma	Released: October 13, 2017; Label: RCA; Formats: CD, LP, digital download	1	1	1	1	2	2	1	1	1	1	US: 627,000; UK: 513,000; AUS: 100,000+; CAN: 60,000; FRA: 47,600	RIAA: Platinum; ARIA: 4× Platinum; BPI: 2× Platinum; BVMI: Platinum; IFPI AUT: Gold; IFPI SWI: Platinum; MC: 3× Platinum; NVPI: Platinum; RMNZ: 4× Platinum; SNEP: Platinum
Hurts 2B Human	Released: April 26, 2019; Label: RCA; Formats: CD, LP, cassette, digital download	1	1	2	1	7	2	1	1	1	1	US: 95,000; FRA: 36,000	ARIA: Platinum; BPI: Gold; BVMI: Gold; IFPI SWI: Gold; MC: Platinum; RMNZ: Platinum; SNEP: Gold
Trustfall	Released: February 17, 2023; Label: RCA; Format: CD, LP, digital download, streaming	2	1	1	1	2	1	2	1	1	1		ARIA: Gold; BPI: Gold; BVMI: Gold; IFPI SWI: Gold; RMNZ: Platinum; SNEP: Gold
"—" denotes items which were not released in that country or failed to chart.

=== Collaborative albums ===
Title	Album details	Peak chart positions										Sales	Certifications
Title	Album details	US	AUS	CAN	FRA	GER	IRE	NLD	NZ	SWI	UK	Sales	Certifications
Rose Ave.	With Dallas Green; credited to You+Me; Released: October 14, 2014; Label: RCA, Dine Alone; Formats: CD, streaming, digital download	4	2	1	37	6	12	12	7	7	10	US: 50,000	ARIA: Gold; MC: Platinum

=== Live albums ===
Title	Album details	Peak chart positions										Certifications
Title	Album details	US	AUS	AUT	CAN	FRA	GER	NLD	NZ	SWI	UK	Certifications
All I Know So Far: Setlist	Released: May 21, 2021; Label: RCA; Formats: CD, streaming, digital download	13	2	6	8	19	5	8	4	2	4	RMNZ: Gold; SNEP: Gold

=== Compilation albums ===
List of compilation albums, with selected chart positions, certifications and sales figures
Title	Album details	Peak chart positions											Sales	Certifications
Title	Album details	US	AUS	AUT	CAN	FRA	GER	IRE	JPN	NLD	NZ	UK	Sales	Certifications
Missundaztood / Can't Take Me Home	Released: September 5, 2005; Label: Sony BMG; Formats: CD	—	39	—	—	196	—	—	—	—	—	—		BPI: Gold
Pink Box	Released: 2007; Label: Sony BMG; Formats: CD	—	13	—	—	—	—	—	—	—	—	7		ARIA: Platinum; BPI: Gold
Greatest Hits... So Far!!!	Released: November 19, 2010; Label: LaFace, Jive; Formats: CD, CD/DVD, digital download	5	1	4	4	8	3	8	10	3	1	5	US: 1,156,000; UK: 1,050,000	RIAA: Platinum; ARIA: 11× Platinum; BPI: 5× Platinum; BVMI: 5× Gold; IFPI AUT: Gold; IRMA: Platinum; MC: 2× Platinum; RMNZ: 7× Platinum; SNEP: Gold
The Album Collection	Released: 2011; Label: Sony Music; Format: CD	—	—	—	—	—	—	—	—	—	—	—		
The Albums... So Far!	Released: October 23, 2015; Label: Sony Music; Format: CD	—	—	—	—	160	—	—	—	—	—	—		
Greatest Hits... So Far 2019!!!	Released: October 16, 2019; Label: Sony Music; Format: CD	—	—	—	—	—	—	—	—	—	—	—		
"—" denotes items which were not released in that country or failed to chart.

== Extended plays ==
List of extended plays
Title	Details
The Remixes	Released: February 20, 2007; Label: LaFace; Format: Digital download

== Singles ==
=== As lead artist ===
List of singles, with selected chart positions and certifications
Title	Year	Peak chart positions										Sales	Certifications	Album
Title	Year	US	AUS	AUT	CAN	DEN	GER	NZ	SWE	SWI	UK	Sales	Certifications	Album
"There You Go"	2000	7	2	—	6	—	65	6	26	37	6	US: 600,000	RIAA: Gold; ARIA: Platinum; BPI: Silver; RMNZ: Gold	Can't Take Me Home
"Most Girls"	2000	4	1	—	2	—	—	2	44	—	5	US: 95,000	ARIA: 2× Platinum; RMNZ: Gold	Can't Take Me Home
"You Make Me Sick"	2000	33	25	—	—	—	88	10	—	—	9	US: 93,000	ARIA: Gold	Can't Take Me Home
"Lady Marmalade" (with Christina Aguilera, Lil' Kim and Mýa)	2001	1	1	3	17	2	1	1	1	1	1	US: 255,000	RIAA: Platinum; ARIA: 2× Platinum; BPI: 2× Platinum; BVMI: Platinum; GLF: Platinum; IFPI AUT: Gold; IFPI DEN: Platinum; IFPI SWI: Gold; RMNZ: 2× Platinum	Music From Baz Luhrmann's Film "Moulin Rouge!"
"Get the Party Started"	2001	4	1	2	11	2	2	1	3	2	2	US: 836,000	RIAA: Gold; ARIA: 5× Platinum; BPI: Platinum; BVMI: Gold; GLF: Gold; IFPI AUT: Gold; IFPI SWI: Gold; MC: Platinum; RMNZ: Platinum	Missundaztood
"Don't Let Me Get Me"	2002	8	8	10	—	4	10	1	5	10	6	US: 303,000	ARIA: 2× Platinum; BPI: Gold; GLF: Gold; MC: Gold; RMNZ: Gold	Missundaztood
"Just Like a Pill"	2002	8	97	2	4	10	2	2	5	6	1	US: 483,000	ARIA: 2× Platinum; BPI: Platinum; BVMI: Gold; IFPI AUT: Gold; IFPI DEN: Gold; MC: Platinum; RMNZ: Platinum	Missundaztood
"Family Portrait"	2002	20	11	11	—	11	8	5	5	18	11	US: 180,000	ARIA: 2× Platinum; BPI: Gold; MC: Gold; RMNZ: Gold	Missundaztood
"Feel Good Time" (featuring William Orbit)	2003	60	7	9	—	14	16	17	39	12	3	US: 1,000	ARIA: Gold	Charlie's Angels: Full Throttle – Music from the Motion Picture
"Trouble"	2003	68	8	5	2	8	7	20	8	5	7	US: 233,000	ARIA: Platinum; BPI: Silver	Try This
"God Is a DJ"	2003	— (Note: "God Is a DJ" did not enter the US Billboard Hot 100, but peaked at number 3 on the Billboard Bubbling Under Hot 100 Chart.)	24	26	—	16	44	30	49	32	11		ARIA: Gold	Try This
"Last to Know"	2004	—	—	48	—	—	66	—	—	46	21			Try This
"Stupid Girls"	2006	13	4	3	2	6	5	7	16	2	4	US: 905,000	RIAA: Gold; ARIA: 2× Platinum; BPI: Silver; MC: Gold	I'm Not Dead
"Who Knew"	2006	9	2	11	46	—	12	11	42	14	5	US: 1,667,000	RIAA: Platinum; ARIA: 5× Platinum; BPI: 2× Platinum; BVMI: Gold; IFPI DEN: Gold; MC: Platinum; RMNZ: 2× Platinum	I'm Not Dead
"U + Ur Hand"	2006	9	5	3	24	8	4	10	5	5	10	US: 1,676,000	RIAA: Platinum; ARIA: 3× Platinum; BPI: Platinum; BVMI: Gold; GLF: Platinum; IFPI AUT: Gold; IFPI DEN: Gold; MC: Platinum; RMNZ: Platinum	I'm Not Dead
"Nobody Knows"	2006	—	27	21	—	—	17	—	—	17	27		ARIA: Gold	I'm Not Dead
"Dear Mr. President" (featuring Indigo Girls)	2006	—	5	1	55	—	3	11	18	3	—		ARIA: 3× Platinum; BPI: Silver; BVMI: Platinum; IFPI AUT: Platinum; MC: Gold	I'm Not Dead
"Leave Me Alone (I'm Lonely)"	2007	—	5	—	—	—	—	5	—	—	34		ARIA: 2× Platinum; BPI: Silver; RMNZ: Gold	I'm Not Dead
"So What"	2008	1	1	1	1	3	1	1	2	1	1	US: 4,624,000	ARIA: 10× Platinum; BPI: 3× Platinum; BVMI: Platinum; GLF: Gold; IFPI AUT: Gold; IFPI DEN: Platinum; IFPI SWI: Platinum; MC: 5× Platinum; RMNZ: 3× Platinum	Funhouse
"Sober"	2008	15	6	4	8	14	3	7	12	5	9	US: 2,037,000	ARIA: 5× Platinum; BPI: Gold; BVMI: Gold; IFPI AUT: Gold; IFPI DEN: Gold; IFPI SWI: Gold; MC: 2× Platinum; RMNZ: Platinum	Funhouse
"Please Don't Leave Me"	2009	17	11	5	8	14	8	19	16	9	12	US: 1,318,000	ARIA: 3× Platinum; BPI: Platinum; BVMI: Gold; IFPI AUT: Gold; IFPI DEN: Gold; IFPI SWI: Gold; MC: 2× Platinum; RMNZ: Platinum	Funhouse
"Bad Influence"	2009	—	6	20	—	—	26	12	—	44	—		ARIA: 2× Platinum	Funhouse
"Funhouse"	2009	44	6	7	21	32	16	15	13	8	29	US: 743,000	ARIA: 2× Platinum; BPI: Silver; MC: Platinum; RMNZ: Platinum	Funhouse
"I Don't Believe You"	2009	— (Note: "I Don't Believe You" did not enter the Billboard Hot 100, but reached number 17 on the Bubbling Under Hot 100 Singles extension chart.)	23	23	66	36	—	—	11	33	62		ARIA: Platinum; MC: Gold	Funhouse
"Glitter in the Air"	2010	18	—	—	13	—	—	—	—	—	—	US: 699,000	ARIA: Gold; MC: Platinum	Funhouse
"Raise Your Glass"	2010	1	1	9	2	12	5	5	15	9	13	US: 4,162,000	RIAA: 5× Platinum; ARIA: 10× Platinum; BPI: 2× Platinum; BVMI: Gold; GLF: Gold; IFPI DEN: Platinum; IFPI SWI: Gold; MC: 4× Platinum; RMNZ: 5× Platinum	Greatest Hits... So Far!!!
"Fuckin' Perfect"	2010	2	10	9	2	4	7	2	23	15	10	US: 3,010,000	ARIA: 5× Platinum; BPI: Platinum; BVMI: Gold; GLF: Platinum; IFPI DEN: Platinum; MC: 4× Platinum; RMNZ: 2× Platinum	Greatest Hits... So Far!!!
"Bridge of Light"	2011	—	26	7	—	—	8	—	—	8	—		ARIA: Platinum; BVMI: Gold	Happy Feet Two: Original Motion Picture Soundtrack
"Blow Me (One Last Kiss)"	2012	5	1	14	4	24	10	8	—	15	3	US. 2,164,000	ARIA: 5× Platinum; BPI: Platinum; BVMI: Gold; IFPI DEN: Gold; IFPI SWI: Gold; MC: 4× Platinum; RMNZ: Platinum	The Truth About Love
"Try"	2012	9	6	3	4	15	2	7	47	2	8	US: 2,000,000	ARIA: 7× Platinum; BPI: 2× Platinum; BVMI: Platinum; GLF: Platinum; IFPI AUT: Gold; IFPI DEN: Platinum; IFPI SWI: 2× Platinum; MC: 6× Platinum; RMNZ: 4× Platinum	The Truth About Love
"Just Give Me a Reason" (featuring Nate Ruess)	2013	1	1	1	1	3	1	1	1	2	2	US: 4,405,000	RIAA: 2× Platinum; ARIA: 13× Platinum; BPI: 4× Platinum; BVMI: 3× Gold; GLF: 3× Platinum; IFPI AUT: Platinum; IFPI DEN: 3× Platinum; IFPI SWI: 2× Platinum; MC: Diamond; RMNZ: 7× Platinum	The Truth About Love
"True Love" (featuring Lily Allen)	2013	53	5	30	20	—	43	14	—	50	16		ARIA: 4× Platinum; BPI: Gold; IFPI DEN: Gold; MC: Platinum; RMNZ: Platinum	The Truth About Love
"Walk of Shame"	2013	—	60	—	—	—	—	—	—	—	—		ARIA: Platinum	The Truth About Love
"Are We All We Are"	2013	—	—	—	—	—	82	—	—	—	—		ARIA: Gold	The Truth About Love
"Today's the Day"	2015	— (Note: "Today's the Day" did not enter the Billboard Hot 100, but reached number 17 on the Bubbling Under Hot 100 Singles extension chart.)	11	53	42	—	76	—	—	48	—		ARIA: Platinum	Non-album single
"Just Like Fire"	2016	10	1	16	11	—	21	11	85	33	19	US: 1,000,000	RIAA: Platinum; ARIA: 6× Platinum; BPI: Platinum; BVMI: Gold; IFPI DEN: Gold; MC: Platinum; RMNZ: 2× Platinum	Alice Through the Looking Glass: Original Motion Picture Soundtrack
"Setting the World on Fire" (with Kenny Chesney)	2016	29	26	—	48	—	—	—	—	—	—	US: 624,000	RIAA: 2× Platinum; ARIA: Gold; MC: Platinum; RMNZ: Gold	Cosmic Hallelujah
"What About Us"	2017	13	1	3	6	21	3	9	15	1	3	US: 290,226	RIAA: Platinum; ARIA: 8× Platinum; BPI: 3× Platinum; BVMI: 3× Gold; GLF: 2× Platinum; IFPI AUT: Gold; IFPI DEN: Platinum; IFPI SWI: 3× Platinum; MC: 5× Platinum; RMNZ: 5× Platinum	Beautiful Trauma
"Beautiful Trauma"	2017	78	25	45	51	—	80	— (Note: "Beautiful Trauma" did not enter the NZ Top 40 Singles Chart, but peaked at number one on the NZ Heatseekers Singles Chart.)	—	46	25		ARIA: 3× Platinum; BPI: Platinum; IFPI DEN: Platinum; IFPI SWI: Gold; MC: 2× Platinum; RMNZ: Platinum	Beautiful Trauma
"Whatever You Want"	2018	—	44	—	— (Note: "Whatever You Want" did not enter the Canadian Hot 100, but did peak at number 39 on the Hot Canadian Digital Song Sales chart.)	—	—	— (Note: "Whatever You Want" did not enter the NZ Top 40 Singles Chart, but peaked at number four on the NZ Heatseekers Singles Chart.)	—	79	—		ARIA: Gold; RMNZ: Gold	Beautiful Trauma
"Secrets"	2018	—	—	—	—	—	—	— (Note: "Secrets" did not enter the NZ Top 40 Singles Chart, but peaked at number 13 on the NZ Top 40 Hot Singles.)	—	—	—		ARIA: Gold; RMNZ: Gold	Beautiful Trauma
"A Million Dreams"	2018	90	26	—	80	—	70	— (Note: "A Million Dreams" did not enter the NZ Singles Chart, but peaked at number seven on the NZ Hot Singles Chart.)	—	16	11		RIAA: Platinum; ARIA: Gold; BPI: Platinum; RMNZ: Gold	The Greatest Showman: Reimagined
"Walk Me Home"	2019	49	11	36	17	—	33	16	35	8	8		RIAA: Platinum; ARIA: 4× Platinum; BPI: 2× Platinum; BVMI: Gold; GLF: Gold; IFPI DEN: Platinum; IFPI SWI: Gold; MC: 3× Platinum; RMNZ: 2× Platinum	Hurts 2B Human
"Can We Pretend" (featuring Cash Cash)	2019	— (Note: "Can We Pretend" did not enter the US Billboard Hot 100, but did peak at number 31 on the Digital Song Sales chart.)	99	—	99	—	—	— (Note: "Can We Pretend" did not enter the NZ Top 40 Singles Chart, but peaked at number 14 on the NZ Hot Singles Chart.)	—	76	88		ARIA: Platinum; BPI: Silver; MC: Gold; RMNZ: Gold	Hurts 2B Human
"Hurts 2B Human" (featuring Khalid)	2019	—	48	—	87	—	—	— (Note: "Hurts 2B Human" did not enter the NZ Top 40 Singles Chart, but peaked at number two on the NZ Hot Singles Chart.)	— (Note: "Hurts 2B Human" did not enter the Swedish Singellista Chart, but peaked at number four on the Swedish Heatseeker Chart.)	59	61		ARIA: Platinum; BPI: Silver; RMNZ: Gold	Hurts 2B Human
"Love Me Anyway" (featuring Chris Stapleton)	2019	96	—	—	— (Note: "Love Me Anyway" did not enter the Canadian Hot 100, but did peak at number five on the Canadian Digital Song Sales chart.)	—	—	— (Note: "Love Me Anyway" did not enter the NZ Top 40 Singles Chart, but peaked at number 24 on the NZ Hot Singles Chart.)	—	—	—		ARIA: Gold; MC: Gold; RMNZ: Gold	Hurts 2B Human
"One Too Many" (with Keith Urban)	2020	52	6	—	22	—	—	— (Note: "One Too Many" did not enter the NZ Top 40 Singles Chart, but peaked at number two on the NZ Hot Singles Chart.)	—	—	40		RIAA: Platinum; ARIA: 5× Platinum; BPI: Gold; IFPI DEN: Gold; MC: Platinum; RMNZ: 2× Platinum	The Speed of Now Part 1
"Cover Me in Sunshine" (with Willow Sage Hart)	2021	— (Note: "Cover Me in Sunshine" did not enter the Billboard Hot 100, but reached number four on the Bubbling Under Hot 100 extension chart.)	6	3	60	—	7	24	28	4	52		ARIA: 4× Platinum; BPI: Gold; BVMI: Platinum; GLF: 2× Platinum; IFPI AUT: Platinum; IFPI DEN: Platinum; IFPI SWI: Platinum; MC: 2× Platinum; RMNZ: 3× Platinum	All I Know So Far: Setlist
"Anywhere Away from Here" (with Rag'n'Bone Man)	2021	— (Note: "Anywhere Away from Here" did not enter the US Billboard Hot 100, but did peak at number 12 on the Digital Song Sales chart.)	43	—	88	—	—	— (Note: "Anywhere Away from Here" did not enter the NZ Top 40 Singles Chart, but peaked at number eight on the NZ Hot Singles Chart.)	—	56	9		BPI: Platinum; RMNZ: Gold	Life by Misadventure
"All I Know So Far"	2021	74	25	68	30	—	75	— (Note: "All I Know So Far" did not enter the NZ Top 40 Singles Chart, but peaked at number six on the NZ Hot Singles Chart.)	99	48	39		ARIA: Platinum; BPI: Gold; MC: Platinum; RMNZ: Gold	All I Know So Far: Setlist
"Irrelevant"	2022	— (Note: "Irrelevant" did not enter the US Billboard Hot 100, but did peak at number six on the Digital Song Sales chart.)	73	—	— (Note: "Irrelevant" did not enter the Canadian Hot 100, but did peak at number five on the Canadian Digital Song Sales chart.)	—	—	— (Note: "Irrelevant" did not enter the NZ Top 40 Singles Chart, but peaked at number seven on the NZ Hot Singles Chart.)	—	—	— (Note: "Irrelevant" did not enter the UK Singles Chart but peaked at number 16 on the UK Single Downloads Chart.)			Trustfall: Tour Deluxe Edition
"Never Gonna Not Dance Again"	2022	99	65	53	29	—	86	— (Note: "Never Gonna Not Dance Again" did not enter the NZ Top 40 Singles Chart, but peaked at number 9 on the NZ Hot Singles Chart.)	— (Note: "Never Gonna Not Dance Again" did not enter the Swedish Singellista Chart, but peaked at number 13 on the Swedish Heatseeker Chart.)	58	19		ARIA: Gold; BPI: Gold; IFPI DEN: Gold; IFPI SWI: Gold; MC: Platinum; RMNZ: Gold	Trustfall
"Trustfall"	2023	82	19	12	24	—	17	36	26	8	14		ARIA: Gold; BPI: Platinum; BVMI: Gold; IFPI DEN: Gold; IFPI SWI: Platinum; MC: Platinum; RMNZ: Platinum	Trustfall
"When I Get There"	2023	— (Note: "When I Get There" did not enter the Billboard Hot 100, but reached number 21 on the Bubbling Under Hot 100 Singles extension chart.)	92	—	94	—	—	— (Note: "When I Get There" did not enter the NZ Top 40 Singles Chart, but peaked at number eight on the NZ Hot Singles Chart.)	—	84	44		BPI: Silver	Trustfall
"Runaway"	2023	—	—	—	—	—	—	— (Note: "Runaway" did not enter the NZ Top 40 Singles Chart, but peaked at number 15 on the NZ Hot Singles Chart.)	—	—	— (Note: "Runaway" did not enter the UK Singles Chart but peaked at number 77 on the UK Single Downloads Chart.)			Trustfall
"Dreaming" (with Marshmello and Sting)	2023	—	—	—	64	—	93	— (Note: "Dreaming" did not enter the NZ Top 40 Singles Chart, but peaked at number 13 on the NZ Hot Singles Chart.)	—	—	99			Trustfall: Tour Deluxe Edition
"All Out of Fight"	2023	—	—	—	—	—	—	— (Note: "All Out of Fight" did not enter the NZ Top 40 Singles Chart, but peaked at number 23 on the NZ Hot Singles Chart.)	—	—	—			Trustfall: Tour Deluxe Edition
"—" denotes a recording that did not chart in that territory.

=== As featured artist ===
Title	Year	Peak chart positions									Certifications	Album
Title	Year	AUS	AUT	CAN	FRA	GER	IRE	NOR	NZ Heat.	UK	Certifications	Album
"I Am Not My Hair" (India.Arie featuring Pink)	2006	—	—	—	—	—	—	—	—	—		Non-album remix
"Rock and Roll Heaven's Gate" (Indigo Girls featuring Pink)	2006	—	—	—	—	—	—	—	—	—		Despite Our Differences
"Waterfall" (Stargate featuring Pink and Sia)	2017	19	70	23	36	47	85	30	1	47	ARIA: Gold	Non-album single
"—" denotes a recording that did not chart in that territory.

=== Charity singles ===
Title	Year	Peak chart positions									Album
Title	Year	US	AUS	CAN	DEN	IRE	NZ	RUS	SWE	UK	Album
"Sing" (Annie Lennox featuring various artists)	2007	— (Note: "Sing" did not enter the Billboard Hot 100 Chart, but peaked at number 18 on the Billboard Dance Club Songs Chart.)	—	—	—	—	—	129	—	161	Songs of Mass Destruction
"We Are the World 25 for Haiti" (Artists for Haiti)	2010	2	18	7	10	9	8	—	5	50	Non-album singles
"Hands" (Various artists)	2016	— (Note: "Hands" did not enter the Billboard Hot 100 Chart, but peaked at number 30 on the Billboard Pop Digital Songs Chart.)	—	—	—	—	—	—	—	—	Non-album singles
"—" denotes a recording that did not chart in that territory.

=== Promotional singles ===
List of promotional singles, with selected chart positions
Title	Year	Peak chart positions									Certifications	Album
Title	Year	US Dig.	AUS	CAN Dig.	CRO	HUN Air.	NZ	POL Air.	SCO	SWI	Certifications	Album
"Humble Neighborhoods"	2003	—	—	—	—	—	—	—	—	—		Try This
"Catch Me While I'm Sleeping"	2003	—	—	—	—	—	—	—	—	—		Try This
"'Cuz I Can"	2007	—	— (Note: "'Cuz I Can" did not enter the Australian Singles Chart, but did peak at number 14 on the ARIA Digital Track Chart)	—	—	—	29	—	—	—	ARIA: Platinum	I'm Not Dead
"Ave Mary A"	2010	—	—	—	—	—	—	—	—	—		Funhouse
"Heartbreak Down"	2011	—	—	—	—	2	—	—	—	—		Greatest Hits... So Far!
"You and Me"	2014	—	—	—	—	—	—	—	—	64		Rose Ave.
"Break the Cycle"	2014	—	—	—	—	—	—	—	—	—		Rose Ave.
"Capsized"	2014	—	—	—	—	—	—	—	—	—		Rose Ave.
"Hustle"	2019	11	69	12	72	—	— (Note: "Hustle" did not enter the NZ Top 40 Singles Chart, but peaked at number 25 on the NZ Hot Singles Chart.)	85	30	75	ARIA: Gold	Hurts 2B Human
"Long Way to Go"	2023	—	—	—	—	—	—	—	—	—		Trustfall
"—" denotes a recording that did not chart.

== Other charted and certified songs ==
List of other charted songs, with selected chart positions
Title	Year	Peak chart positions										Certifications	Album
Title	Year	US	AUS	AUT	CAN	FRA	GER	IRE	NLD	NZ	UK	Certifications	Album
"Won't Back Down" (Eminem featuring Pink)	2010	62	87	—	65	—	—	—	—	—	82	RIAA: Platinum; ARIA: Gold; BPI: Silver	Recovery
"Guns and Roses" (T.I. featuring Pink)	2013	—	18	—	—	—	—	—	—	—	—	ARIA: Platinum	Trouble Man: Heavy Is the Head
"Slut Like You"	2013	—	—	—	—	—	—	—	—	—	—	ARIA: Gold	The Truth About Love
"Revenge" (featuring Eminem)	2017	— (Note: "Revenge" did not enter the Billboard Hot 100, but reached number one on the Bubbling Under Hot 100 Singles extension chart.)	21	52	63	95	84	55	24	30	33	ARIA: Platinum; BPI: Silver; MC: Gold; RMNZ: Platinum	Beautiful Trauma
"Where We Go"	2017	—	88	—	—	184	—	—	—	— (Note: "Where We Go" did not enter the NZ Top 40 Singles Chart, but peaked at number 2 on the NZ Heatseekers Singles Chart.)	—	ARIA: Gold	Beautiful Trauma
"I Am Here"	2017	—	97	—	—	—	—	—	—	—	—	ARIA: Gold; BPI: Silver; RMNZ: Gold	Beautiful Trauma
"Wild Hearts Can't Be Broken"	2017	—	—	—	— (Note: "Wild Hearts Can't Be Broken" did not enter the Canadian Hot 100, but did peak at number 45 on the Hot Canadian Digital Song Sales chart.)	—	—	—	—	—	—	ARIA: Gold	Beautiful Trauma
"Barbies"	2017	—	—	—	—	—	—	—	—	—	—	ARIA: Gold	Beautiful Trauma
"But We Lost It"	2017	—	—	—	—	—	—	—	—	—	—	ARIA: Gold	Beautiful Trauma
"Need Me" (Eminem featuring Pink)	2017	—	98	—	98	197	—	—	—	—	—		Revival
"Bennie and the Jets" (with Elton John and Logic)	2018	— (Note: "Bennie and the Jets" did not enter the US Billboard Hot 100, but did peak at number 40 on the Digital Song Sales chart.)	—	—	—	—	—	—	—	— (Note: "Bennie and the Jets" did not enter the NZ Top 40 Singles Chart, but peaked at number seven on the NZ Heatseeker Singles Chart.)	—		Revamp
"90 Days" (featuring Wrabel)	2019	—	—	—	— (Note: "90 Days" did not enter the Canadian Hot 100, but did peak at number 48 on the Hot Canadian Digital Song Sales chart.)	—	—	—	—	—	—		Hurts 2B Human
"Turbulence"	2023	— (Note: "Turbulence" did not enter the US Billboard Hot 100, but did peak at number 46 on the Digital Song Sales chart.)	—	—	— (Note: "Turbulence" did not enter the Canadian Hot 100, but did peak at number 35 on the Canadian Digital Song Sales chart.)	—	—	—	—	— (Note: "Turbulence" did not enter the NZ Top 40 Singles Chart, but peaked at number 23 on the NZ Hot Singles Chart.)	— (Note: "Turbulence" did not enter the UK Singles Chart but peaked at number 61 on the UK Single Downloads Chart.)		Trustfall
"Just Say I'm Sorry" (featuring Chris Stapleton)	2023	— (Note: "Just Say I'm Sorry" did not enter the US Billboard Hot 100, but did peak at number six on the Digital Song Sales chart.)	—	—	— (Note: "Just Say I'm Sorry" did not enter the Canadian Hot 100, but did peak at number seven on the Canadian Digital Song Sales chart.)	—	—	—	—	—	— (Note: "Just Say I'm Sorry" did not enter the UK Singles Chart but peaked at number 95 on the UK Single Downloads Chart.)		Trustfall
"—" denotes a recording that did not chart.

== Other appearances ==
List of non-single guest appearances, with other performing artists, showing year released and album name
Title	Year	Other performer(s)	Album
"Play How You Want It"	2000	Cuban Link	24K
"Nobody Liver"	2001	Benzino	The Benzino Project
"What You Wanna Do?"	2002	Naughty by Nature	IIcons
"Finally Goodbye"	2003	Vita	La Dolce Vita
"Still Waiting" (unreleased)	2003	Charli Baltimore	The Diary (You Think You Know)
"We Will Rock You"	2004	Britney Spears and Beyoncé	Pepsi: Dare For More
"Tell Me Why"	2004	Rah Digga	Everything Is a Story
"Shine"	2005	Lisa Marie Presley	Now What
"Song Without a Chorus"	2006	Butch Walker	The Rise and Fall of Butch Walker and the Let's-Go-Out-Tonites
"One Step Closer to You"	2006	Michael Franti	Yell Fire!
"I Am Not My Hair"	2006	India.Arie	Testimony: Vol. 1, Life & Relationship
"Rock and Roll Heaven's Gate"	2006	Indigo Girls	Despite Our Differences
"Here Comes The..."	2008	Butch Walker	Sycamore Meadows
"We've Got Scurvy"	2009	—N/a	SpongeBob's Greatest Hits
"Won't Back Down"	2010	Eminem	Recovery
"Don't Give Up"	2010	Herbie Hancock, John Legend	The Imagine Project
"Imagine"	2010	Herbie Hancock, Seal, India.Arie, Jeff Beck, Konono N°1, Oumou Sangaré	The Imagine Project
"Guns and Roses"	2012	T.I.	Trouble Man: Heavy Is the Head
"Equal Rights"	2016	The Lonely Island	Popstar: Never Stop Never Stopping
"Hands"	2016	Various Artists	—N/a
"Halfway Gone"	2017	—N/a	Served Like a Girl
"Need Me"	2017	Eminem	Revival
"Bennie and the Jets"	2018	Elton John, Logic	Revamp: Reimagining the Songs of Elton John & Bernie Taupin
"(I Can't Get No) Satisfaction"	2023	Dolly Parton, Brandi Carlile	Rockstar

== Videography ==
=== Video albums ===
Title	Album details	Notes	Certifications
Pink: Live in Europe	Released: May 22, 2006; Label: LaFace; Format: DVD	Contains the Try This Tour European leg of 2004. Shot live from Manchester, United Kingdom.	RIAA: Gold; ARIA: 11× Platinum; BPI: Platinum; BVMI: 3× Gold; IFPI AUT: Gold
Live from Wembley Arena, London, England	Released: March 22, 2007; Label: LaFace; Format: DVD	Contains her performance at Wembley Arena, London on her I'm Not Dead Tour.	ARIA: 16× Platinum; BPI: Platinum; BVMI: 2× Platinum; RMNZ: Gold; SNEP: Gold
Funhouse Tour: Live in Australia	Released: October 14, 2009; Label: LaFace, Jive; Format: DVD, Blu-ray, CD	Contains footage from Pink's two concerts on July 17 and 18, 2009 at the Sydney Entertainment Centre as part of the Funhouse Tour.	RIAA: Gold; ARIA: 32× Platinum; BPI: Platinum; BVMI: 5× Gold; RMNZ: Platinum
Greatest Hits... So Far!!!	Released: November 11, 2011; Label: Sony; Format: DVD	Standalone release of DVD packaged with the deluxe edition of Greatest Hits... So Far!!! updated with videos made for singles from said album. Features all Pink music videos from "There You Go" to "Fuckin' Perfect" (excluding charity single videos, "Lady Marmalade", and "Feel Good Time").	ARIA: 2× Platinum
The Truth About Love Tour: Live from Melbourne	Released: November 15, 2013; Label: RCA, Sony; Format: DVD, Blu-ray	Contains footage of concerts held at Rod Laver Arena in Melbourne, Australia as part of The Truth About Love Tour.	ARIA: 16× Platinum; BPI: Gold; BVMI: Gold

=== Music videos ===
Year	Title	Director(s)	Album
1999	"There You Go"	Dave Meyers	Can't Take Me Home
2000	"Most Girls"	Dave Meyers	Can't Take Me Home
2000	"You Make Me Sick"	Dave Meyers	Can't Take Me Home
2001	"Get the Party Started"	Dave Meyers	Missundaztood
2002	"Don't Let Me Get Me"	Dave Meyers	Missundaztood
2002	"Just Like a Pill"	Francis Lawrence	Missundaztood
2002	"Family Portrait"	Sophie Muller	Missundaztood
2003	"Feel Good Time"	Dave Meyers	Charlie's Angels: Full Throttle soundtrack
2003	"Trouble"	Sophie Muller	Trouble
2003	"God Is a DJ"	Jake Scott	Trouble
2004	"Last to Know"	Russell Thomas	Trouble
2005	"Stupid Girls"	Dave Meyers	I'm Not Dead
2005	"U + Ur Hand"	Dave Meyers	I'm Not Dead
2006	"Who Knew"	The Dragons	I'm Not Dead
2006	"Nobody Knows"	Jake Nava	I'm Not Dead
2007	"Dear Mr. President"	Dave Diomedi	I'm Not Dead
2007	"Leave Me Alone (I'm Lonely)"	David Mallet	I'm Not Dead
2008	"So What"	Dave Meyers	Funhouse
2008	"Sober"	Jonas Åkerlund	Funhouse
2008	"Please Don't Leave Me"	Dave Meyers	Funhouse
2009	"Funhouse"	Dave Meyers	Funhouse
2009	"I Don't Believe You"	Sophie Muller	Funhouse
2009	"We've Got Scurvy"	Nickelodeon/Sony Music	SpongeBob's Greatest Hits
2010	"Leave Me Alone (I'm Lonely)" (live from Wembley Arena)	Dave Meyers	non-album
2010	"Raise Your Glass"	Dave Meyers	Greatest Hits... So Far!!!
2011	"F**kin' Perfect"	Dave Meyers	Greatest Hits... So Far!!!
2012	"Blow Me (One Last Kiss)" (2 versions)	Dave Meyers	The Truth About Love
2012	"Try"	Floria Sigismondi	The Truth About Love
2013	"Just Give Me a Reason"	Diane Martel	The Truth About Love
2013	"True Love"	Sophie Muller	The Truth About Love
2013	"Are We All We Are"		The Truth About Love
2016	"Just Like Fire"	Dave Meyers	Alice Through the Looking Glass soundtrack
2017	"What About Us"	Georgia Hudson	Beautiful Trauma
2017	"Beautiful Trauma"	GoldenBoyz	Beautiful Trauma
2018	"Wild Hearts Can't Be Broken"	Sasha Samsonova	Beautiful Trauma
2018	"Whatever You Want"	Alecia Moore	Beautiful Trauma
2018	"Secrets"	Alecia Moore; Larn Poland	Beautiful Trauma
2019	"Walk Me Home"	Michael Gracey	Hurts 2B Human
2019	"90 Days" (featuring Wrabel)	Remi Bakkar; Jeremy Hudson	Hurts 2B Human
2019	"Hurts 2B Human" (featuring Khalid)	Alissa Torvinen	Hurts 2B Human
2021	"Cover Me in Sunshine" (with Willow Sage Hart)	P!nk; Willow Sage Hart	All I Know So Far: Setlist
2021	"All I Know So Far"	Dave Meyers	All I Know So Far: Setlist
2022	"Irrelevant"	P!nk; Brad Comfort	Trustfall: Tour Deluxe Edition
2022	"Never Gonna Not Dance Again"	Nick Florez & RJ Dure	Trustfall
2023	"Trustfall"	Georgia Hudson	Trustfall
2023	"All Out of Fight"	David Spearing	Trustfall: Tour Deluxe Edition

=== Collaborations in music videos ===
Year	Title	Other Performer	Director	Album
2001	"Lady Marmalade"	Christina Aguilera, Lil' Kim and Mýa	Paul Hunter	Moulin Rouge! soundtrack
2005	"Tears in Heaven"	Tsunami Relief (various artists)	Marcus Raboy	non-album
2010	"We Are the World 25 for Haiti"	Artists for Haiti	Paul Haggis	non-album
2016	"Setting the World on Fire"	Kenny Chesney	P. R. Brown	Cosmic Hallelujah
2017	"Waterfall" (only vocals)	Stargate and Sia	Malia James	non-album
2020	"One Too Many"	Keith Urban	Dano Cerny	The Speed of Now Part 1
2021	"Anywhere Away from Here"	Rag'n'Bone Man	Joe Connor	Life by Misadventure

== See also ==
- List of best-selling albums in Australia
- You+Me duo with Dallas Green
