= Live from Wembley Arena, London, England =

Video by Pink
- Released: March 22, 2007
- Recorded: December 4, 2006
- Venue: Wembley Arena (London, England)
- Genre: Pop; pop rock; R&B
- Length: 93:15
- Label: LaFace
- Director: David Mallet

Pink chronology
Pink: Live in Europe (2006)	Live from Wembley Arena, London, England (2007)	Funhouse Tour: Live in Australia (2009)

Live from Wembley Arena, London, England is a Pink music DVD released on March 22, 2007. It was recorded at London's Wembley Arena on December 4, 2006 during her I'm Not Dead Tour. In Australia it was rated M for moderate coarse language.

The release was largely successful, especially in Australia, where it debuted at number 1 on the ARIA DVD chart and has been certified 16 times Platinum.

== Track listing ==
Standard edition
No.	Title	Length
1.	"Opening"	2:24
2.	"Cuz I Can"	3:33
3.	"Trouble"	3:17
4.	"Just like a Pill"	4:02
5.	"Who Knew"	3:42
6.	"I'm Not Dead"	3:41
7.	"Stupid Girls"	3:26
8.	"Spanish Dance"	2:18
9.	"There You Go"	3:35
10.	"God Is a DJ"	1:48
11.	"Fingers"	4:36
12.	"Family Portrait"	7:54
13.	"The One That Got Away"	5:56
14.	"Dear Mr. President"	4:45
15.	"What's Up"	5:55
16.	"U + Ur Hand"	4:45
17.	"18 Wheeler"	3:25
18.	"Don't Let Me Get Me"	6:45
19.	"Leave Me Alone (I'm Lonely)"	5:38
20.	"Nobody Knows"	4:11
21.	"Get the Party Started"	4:46
22.	"Closing/Credits"	2:17

DVD Bonus
No.	Title	Length
23.	"On Tour with Pink (Video)"	9:44
24.	"Photo Gallery (Video)"	2:40
25.	"Crash and Burn (Audio)"	4:26
26.	"U + Ur Hand [Bimbo Jones Remix] (Audio)"	8:16

== Charts and certifications ==
=== Charts ===
Chart (2007)	Peak position
Australian DVDs Chart	1
Austrian Music DVDs Chart	1
Belgian (Flanders) Music DVDs Chart	2
Belgian (Wallonia) Music DVDs Chart	2
German Albums Chart	19
Greek DVDs Chart	8
Italian Music DVDs Chart	3
Netherlands Music DVD Chart	2
Swedish Music DVDs Chart	8
Swiss Albums Chart	84

=== Certifications ===
Region	Certification	Certified units/sales
Australia (ARIA)	16× Platinum	240,000^{^}
France (SNEP)	Gold	10,000^{*}
Germany (BVMI)	2× Platinum	100,000^{^}
New Zealand (RMNZ)	Gold	2,500^{^}
United Kingdom (BPI)	Platinum	50,000^{*}
^{*} Sales figures based on certification alone.^{^} Shipments figures based on certification alone.
