= I'm Not Dead Tour =

2006–07 concert tour by Pink

- Tour by Pink
- Associated album: I'm Not Dead
- Start date: June 27, 2006
- End date: September 11, 2007
- Legs: 5
- No. of shows: 154

Pink concert chronology
- Try This Tour (2004); I'm Not Dead Tour (2006–07); Funhouse Tour (2009)

The I'm Not Dead Tour was the third concert tour by American singer-songwriter Pink. Launched in support of her fourth studio album, I'm Not Dead (2006) the tour reached Europe, North America, Australia, Africa, and Asia.

== Background ==
After performing several promotional shows throughout North America and Europe, Pink announced her tour in the spring of 2006. The "I'm Not Dead Tour" began in North America in nightclubs and theatres. Pink explained, "Small gigs, that's where it's at [...] You can feel everyone's sweat, it's just so close and intimate. It's stinky, it's smoky, it's good." Pink continued her tour into Europe and Australia, playing predominantly in arenas. As her album gained momentum in the US, she joined Justin Timberlake as the opening act on his FutureSex/LoveShow tour at select venues in the US. Pink returned to Europe during the summer of 2007, playing open air/amphitheater festivals. She concluded her tour in South Africa. The tour became one of the most successful tours in both 2006 and 2007. In Australia, she became the most successful female artist during that time. The Australian leg grossed about $42 million and was Pink's most successful tour until her Funhouse Tour in 2009.

== Opening acts ==
- Marion Raven (Germany—Leg 1)
- Gary "Mudbone" Cooper and Nadirah X(United Kingdom & Northern Ireland—Leg 1)
- The Coronas (United Kingdom & Northern Ireland—Leg 2) (select venues)
- Infernal (Odense)
- The Androids (Australia)
- Lili (Europe—Leg 1) (select venues)
- Sorgente (Europe—Leg 1) (select venues)
- Lââm (Paris)
- Kamera (Europe—Leg 1) (select venues)
- Vanilla Ninja (Europe—Leg 1) (select venues)
- Matt Nathanson – select dates

== Setlist ==
North America
1. "'Cuz I Can"
2. "Trouble"
3. "Just like a Pill"
4. "Stupid Girls" (contains an excerpt from "Most Girls")
5. "Who Knew"
6. "Lady Marmalade"
7. "Family Portrait"
8. "18 Wheeler"
9. "Lonely Girl"
10. "I'm Not Dead"
11. "Don't Let Me Get Me"
12. "There You Go"
13. "What's Up"
14. "Leave Me Alone (I'm Lonely)"
15. "Mercedes Benz"
16. "The One That Got Away"
17. "Dear Mr. President"
18. "Get the Party Started"
European First Leg, Oceanian Leg, Asian Leg and African Leg
1. "'Cuz I Can"
2. "Trouble"
3. "Just like a Pill"
4. "Who Knew"
5. "I'm Not Dead"
6. "Lady Marmalade"
7. "Stupid Girls" (contains an excerpt from "Most Girls")
8. "There You Go"
9. "God Is a DJ"
10. "Fingers"
11. "Family Portrait"
12. "Redemption Song"
13. "The One That Got Away"
14. "Dear Mr. President"
15. "What's Up"
16. "U + Ur Hand"
17. "18 Wheeler"
18. "Don't Let Me Get Me"
19. "Leave Me Alone (I'm Lonely)"

Encore

20. "Nobody Knows"
21. "Get The Party Started"
European Second Leg
1. "'Cuz I Can"
2. "Trouble"
3. "Just like a Pill"
4. "Who Knew"
5. "Stupid Girls" (contains an excerpt from "Most Girls")
6. "I'm Not Dead"
7. "Family Portrait"
8. "My Vietnam"
9. "Last to Know"
10. "Try Too Hard"
11. Medley: "Me and Bobby McGee" / "Mercedes Benz" / "Piece of My Heart"
12. "Lonely Girl"
13. "Don't Let Me Get Me"
14. "18 Wheeler"
15. "Dear Mr. President"
16. "What's Up"
17. "Leave Me Alone (I'm Lonely)"

Encore

18. "U + Ur Hand"
19. "Get the Party Started"

== Tour dates ==
Date	City	Country	Venue
North America
June 27, 2006	San Francisco	United States	Fillmore Auditorium
June 28, 2006	Avalon	United States	Avalon Theatre
June 30, 2006	Las Vegas	United States	The Beach at Mandalay Bay
July 5, 2006	Minneapolis	United States	First Avenue
July 9, 2006	Indianapolis	United States	Vogue Theatre
July 12, 2006	Cleveland	United States	House of Blues
July 13, 2006	Toronto	Canada	Kool Haus
July 15, 2006	Philadelphia	United States	Electric Factory
July 16, 2006	Washington, D.C.	United States	9:30 Club
July 18, 2006	Boston	United States	Avalon Ballroom
July 19, 2006	New York City	United States	Webster Hall
July 21, 2006	Myrtle Beach	United States	House of Blues
July 22, 2006	Atlanta	United States	Atlantic Station
July 24, 2006	Fort Lauderdale	United States	Revolution Live
July 25, 2006	St. Petersburg	United States	Jannus Landing
July 26, 2006	Orlando	United States	House of Blues
July 28, 2006	Houston	United States	Warehouse Live
July 29, 2006	Dallas	United States	Gypsy Tea Room
Europe
September 8, 2006	Istanbul	Turkey	Park Orman
September 9, 2006	Jesolo	Italy	Spiaggia del Faro
September 27, 2006	Zürich	Switzerland	Hallenstadion
September 28, 2006	Innsbruck	Austria	Olympiahalle
October 1, 2006	Antwerp	Belgium	Sportpaleis
October 3, 2006	Birmingham	England	National Indoor Arena
October 4, 2006	London	England	Wembley Arena
October 7, 2006	Munich	Germany	Olympiahalle
October 8, 2006	Freiburg	Germany	Rothaus Arena
October 10, 2006	Berlin	Germany	Max-Schmeling-Halle
October 11, 2006	Hanover	Germany	TUI Arena
October 12, 2006	Nuremberg	Germany	Nuremberg Arena
October 14, 2006	Rotterdam	Netherlands	Sportpaleis van Ahoy
October 15, 2006	Enschede	Netherlands	GO Planet
October 18, 2006	Frankfurt	Germany	Festhalle Frankfurt
October 19, 2006	Cologne	Germany	Kölnarena
October 20, 2006	Oberhausen	Germany	König Pilsener Arena
October 22, 2006	Leipzig	Germany	Arena Leipzig
October 23, 2006	Mannheim	Germany	SAP Arena
October 25, 2006	Copenhagen	Denmark	Forum Copenhagen
October 27, 2006	Oslo	Norway	Oslo Spektrum
October 28, 2006	Stockholm	Sweden	Hovet
October 30, 2006	Helsinki	Finland	Helsinki Ice Hall
October 31, 2006	Tallinn	Estonia	Saku Suurhall Arena
November 1, 2006	Riga	Latvia	Arena Riga
November 5, 2006	Manchester	England	Manchester Evening News Arena
November 7, 2006	Cardiff	England	Cardiff International Arena
November 10, 2006	Newcastle	England	Metro Radio Arena
November 11, 2006	Nottingham	England	Trent FM Arena Nottingham
November 13, 2006	Plymouth	England	Plymouth Pavilions
November 14, 2006	Brighton	England	Brighton Centre
November 16, 2006	Dublin	Ireland	Point Theatre
November 17, 2006	Belfast	Ireland	Odyssey Arena
November 18, 2006	Belfast	Ireland	Odyssey Arena
November 20, 2006	Aberdeen	Scotland	Press & Journal Arena
November 21, 2006	Aberdeen	Scotland	Press & Journal Arena
November 23, 2006	Glasgow	Scotland	Scottish Exhibition Hall 4
November 24, 2006	Glasgow	Scotland	Scottish Exhibition Hall 4
November 26, 2006	Brighton	England	Brighton Centre
November 27, 2006	Bournemouth	England	Windsor Hall
November 29, 2006	Birmingham	England	NEC Arena
November 30, 2006	Glasgow	England	Scottish Exhibition Centre
December 2, 2006	Sheffield	England	Hallam FM Arena
December 3, 2006	Bournemouth	England	Windsor Hall
December 4, 2006	London	England	Wembley Arena
December 6, 2006	Amsterdam	Netherlands	Heineken Music Hall
December 7, 2006	Amsterdam	Netherlands	Heineken Music Hall
December 8, 2006	Stuttgart	Germany	Hanns-Martin-Schleyer-Halle
December 10, 2006	Vienna	Austria	Wiener Stadthalle
December 12, 2006	Hamburg	Germany	Color Line Arena
December 13, 2006	Prague	Czech Republic	Sazka Arena
December 15, 2006	Zagreb	Croatia	Dražen Petrović Basketball Hall
December 16, 2006	Salzburg	Austria	Salzburgarena
December 17, 2006	Geneva	Switzerland	SEG Geneva Arena
December 19, 2006	Paris	France	Palais Omnisports de Paris-Bercy
December 20, 2006	Lyon	France	Halle Tony Garnier
December 21, 2006	Milan	Italy	Mazda Palace
Oceania
April 18, 2007	Perth	Australia	Challenge Stadium
April 19, 2007	Perth	Australia	Challenge Stadium
April 20, 2007	Perth	Australia	Challenge Stadium
April 22, 2007	Adelaide	Australia	Adelaide Entertainment Centre
April 23, 2007	Adelaide	Australia	Adelaide Entertainment Centre
April 26, 2007	Melbourne	Australia	Rod Laver Arena
April 27, 2007	Melbourne	Australia	Rod Laver Arena
April 28, 2007	Melbourne	Australia	Rod Laver Arena
April 30, 2007	Sydney	Australia	Sydney Entertainment Centre
May 1, 2007	Sydney	Australia	Sydney Entertainment Centre
May 4, 2007	Brisbane	Australia	Brisbane Entertainment Centre
May 5, 2007	Brisbane	Australia	Brisbane Entertainment Centre
May 6, 2007	Gold Coast	Australia	GCCEC Arena
May 8, 2007	Newcastle	Australia	Newcastle Entertainment Centre
May 9, 2007	Newcastle	Australia	Newcastle Entertainment Centre
May 11, 2007	Sydney	Australia	Sydney Entertainment Centre
May 12, 2007	Sydney	Australia	Sydney Entertainment Centre
May 13, 2007	Sydney	Australia	Sydney Entertainment Centre
May 15, 2007	Melbourne	Australia	Rod Laver Arena
May 16, 2007	Melbourne	Australia	Rod Laver Arena
May 17, 2007	Adelaide	Australia	Adelaide Entertainment Centre
May 19, 2007	Canberra	Australia	AIS Arena
May 20, 2007	Canberra	Australia	AIS Arena
May 21, 2007	Newcastle	Australia	Newcastle Entertainment Centre
May 23, 2007	Wollongong	Australia	WIN Entertainment Centre
May 25, 2007	Brisbane	Australia	Brisbane Entertainment Centre
May 26, 2007	Brisbane	Australia	Brisbane Entertainment Centre
May 28, 2007	Sydney	Australia	Sydney Entertainment Centre
May 29, 2007	Melbourne	Australia	Rod Laver Arena
May 30, 2007	Adelaide	Australia	Adelaide Entertainment Centre
June 2, 2007	Perth	Australia	Challenge Stadium
June 3, 2007	Perth	Australia	Challenge Stadium
June 4, 2007	Perth	Australia	Challenge Stadium
June 7, 2007	Sydney	Australia	Sydney Entertainment Centre
June 8, 2007	Brisbane	Australia	Brisbane Entertainment Centre
June 10, 2007	Auckland	New Zealand	Vector Arena
Europe
June 23, 2007	Malahide	Ireland	Malahide Castle
June 26, 2007	Gothenburg	Sweden	Trädgår'n
June 28, 2007	Skopje	F.Y.R. Macedonia	Skopje City Stadium
June 30, 2007	Bucharest	Romania	Romexpo
July 5, 2007	Ljubljana	Slovenia	Tivoli Hall
July 6, 2007	Klam	Austria	Burg Clam
July 7, 2007	Werchter	Belgium	Werchter Festival Grounds
July 11, 2007	Götzis	Austria	Möslestadion
July 12, 2007	Locarno	Switzerland	Moon and Stars Festival
July 14, 2007	Killarney	Ireland	Fitzgerald Stadium
July 15, 2007	Edinburgh	Scotland	Edinburgh Castle Esplanade
July 16, 2007	Liverpool	England	Liverpool Summer Pops
July 18, 2007	Lörrach	Germany	Marktplatz Lörrach
July 21, 2007	Soltau	Germany	Heide Park Eventfläche
July 22, 2007	Ulm	Germany	Stadthaus Ulm
July 25, 2007	Rome	Italy	Cavea Auditorium
July 26, 2007	Nyon	Switzerland	Paléo Festival
July 28, 2007	Mannheim	Germany	Ehrenhof
July 29, 2007	Teisnach	Germany	Festplatz Teisnach
July 30, 2007	Graz	Austria	Stadthalle Graz
August 3, 2007	Imst	Austria	Sportplatz Oberstadt
August 8, 2007	Lokeren	Belgium	Lokerse Feesten
August 10, 2007	Óbudai-sziget	Hungary	Sziget Festival
August 11, 2007	Zofingen	Switzerland	Heiternplatz
August 12, 2007	Rothenburg	Germany	Taubertal Festival
August 14, 2007	London	England	Brixton Academy
August 15, 2007	London	England	Brixton Academy
August 17, 2007	Coburg	Germany	Veste Coburg Square
August 18, 2007	Chelmsford	England	Hylands Park
August 19, 2007	Stafford	England	Hylands Park
August 21, 2007	Cardiff	England	Cardiff International arena
August 22, 2007	Plymouth	England	Plymouth Pavilions
August 23, 2007	Brighton	Brighton Centre	
August 25, 2007	Halle	Germany	Gerry Weber Stadion
August 26, 2007	Gelsenkirchen	Germany	Amphitheater Gelsenkirchen
August 28, 2007	Odense	Denmark	Odense Cattle Showgrounds
August 30, 2007	Berlin	Germany	Sommergarten
September 1, 2007	The Hague	Netherlands	Beatstad Malieveld
September 2, 2007	Esch-sur-Alzette	Luxembourg	Terre rouges festival
Asia
September 5, 2007	Dubai	United Arab Emirates	Dubai Media City Amphitheatre
Africa
September 8, 2007	North West	South Africa	Super Bowl Arena
September 9, 2007	Johannesburg	South Africa	Coca-Cola Dome
September 11, 2007	Cape Town	South Africa	Bellville Velodrome

Cancellations and rescheduled shows

July 8, 2006	Royal Oak, Michigan	Royal Oak Music Theatre	Cancelled
November 23, 2006	Lille, France	Zénith de Lille	Cancelled
November 26, 2006	Kyiv, Ukraine	Kyiv Palace of Sports	Cancelled
November 27, 2006	Marseille, France	Le Dôme de Marseille	Cancelled
November 28, 2006	Toulouse, France	Zénith de Toulouse	Cancelled
November 28, 2006	Moscow, Russia	State Kremlin Palace	Cancelled
November 29, 2006	Lyon, France	Halle Tony Garnier	Cancelled
November 29, 2006	Saint Petersburg, Russia	Ice Palace	Cancelled
November 30, 2006	Metz, France	Galaxie Amnéville	Cancelled
December 15, 2006	Ljubljana, Slovenia	Tivoli Hall	Rescheduled to July 5, 2007
December 21, 2006	Luxembourg City, Luxembourg	d'Coque Arena	Cancelled
July 1, 2007	Sofia, Bulgaria	Lokomotiv Stadium	Cancelled
July 3, 2007	Graz, Austria	Stadthalle Graz	Rescheduled to 30 July
July 19, 2007	Athens, Greece	OAKA	Cancelled due to illness

=== Box office score data ===
Venue	City	Tickets sold / available	Gross revenue
The Fillmore	San Francisco	1,273 / 1,273 (100%)	$31,625
The Avalon / Bardot Hollywood	Los Angeles	1,454 / 1,454 (100%)	$33,507
The Vogue	Los Angeles	950 / 950 (100%)	$23,750
First Avenue	Minneapolis	1,404 / 1,404 (100%)	$33,696
House of Blues	Cleveland	1,250 / 1,250 (100%)	$32,130
Kool Haus	Toronto	2,238 / 2,238 (100%)	$61,395
Rotterdam Ahoy	Rotterdam	8,903 / 9,433 (95%)	$455,550
Sportpaleis	Antwerp	11,917 / 12,847 (93%)	$517,759
Point Theatre	Dublin	8,041 / 8,041 (100%)	$397,650
Odyssey Arena	Belfast	18,528 / 18,528 (100%)	$935,766
Forum Copenhagen	Copenhagen	4,572 / 10,000 (45%)	$242,238
Oslo Spektrum	Oslo	6,855 / 8,546 (80%)	$458,463
Hovet	Stockholm	6,187 / 6,574 (94%)	$332,128
Newcastle Entertainment Centre	Newcastle	20,399 / 20,716 (98%)	$1,352,673
Brisbane Entertainment Centre	Brisbane	53,476 / 54,544 (98%)	$3,848,497
Rod Laver Arena	Melbourne	69,341 / 77,074 (90%)	$4,345,558
Sydney Entertainment Centre	Sydney	73,403 / 77,678 (94%)	$4,533,078
TOTAL		256,355 / 270,678 (95%)	$22,963,111

== Personnel ==
- Lead vocals, aerobatics, dancing, executive producer, creator – P!nk
- Musical director, keyboards – Jason Chapman
- Drums – Mark Schulman
- Lead guitar – Justin Derrico
- Bass guitar, vocals – Janis Tanaka
- Keyboards, rhythm guitar, vocals – Adriana Balic
- Vocals – Stacy Campbell
- Vocals – Jenny Douglas-Foote
- Dancing, choreography – Clare Turton
- Dancing, choreography – Ruth Inchaustegui-Prince
- Dancing – Reina Hidalgo
- Choreography - Richmond Talauega
- Choreography - Anthony Talauega
- Aerial choreography – Dreya Weber
- Musical director, arrangements – Paul Mirkovich
- Drums – Rick Hardinge (GCCEC Arena - Australia)
