= Leave Me Alone (I'm Lonely) =

2007 single by Pink

Single by Pink

from the album I'm Not Dead
- B-side: "Dear Mr. President"; "Who Knew"
- Released: March 12, 2007
- Studio: House of Blues; Chateau Marmont (Los Angeles)
- Genre: Power pop
- Length: 3:18
- Label: LaFace
- Songwriters: Pink; Butch Walker
- Producer: Butch Walker

Pink singles chronology
"Nobody Knows" (2006)	"Leave Me Alone (I'm Lonely)" (2007)	"Dear Mr. President" (2007)

Music video
- "Leave Me Alone (I'm Lonely)" on YouTube

"Leave Me Alone (I'm Lonely)" is a song recorded by American singer Pink for her fourth studio album I'm Not Dead (2006). It was written by Pink and the song's producer Butch Walker. The song was released as the fifth single from I'm Not Dead in select international countries on March 12, 2007, by LaFace Records, to mixed critical reception. Commercially, it reached the top five in Australia and New Zealand, giving Pink her 11th top-10 hit in both countries.

== Composition ==
"Leave Me Alone (I'm Lonely)" was written by Pink and co-written and produced by Butch Walker. It is a power pop song in which she demands some time away from a clinging lover.

== Critical reception ==
The song received mixed to positive reviews from critics. IGN's wrote a mixed to favorable review for the song, stating that "The title should say it all and reveal the ball of confusion that Pink really is. It's one of the most rockin' tunes on the whole album, but it's over-the-top arena pop rock, not ball crunching, barroom rawk." Quentin Huff from PopMatters thought that "Pink summons the spirits of the Go-Gos and Tiffany (“I Think We're Alone Now”)" on the track. Todd Murphs from Stylus Magazine wrote a mixed review, saying that "the ode to schizophrenia, “Leave Me Alone (I’m Lonely),” which may rely too much on the chorus, but at little over three minutes, it’s hardly a bother. Especially when she’s dropping f-bombs left and right.

Entertainment Weekly's Chris Willman wrote that "it's a pissy yet affectionate rocker that throws down competing desires for attentiveness and space in a relationship." Barry Walters from Rolling Stone wrote that the song "suggests a mood-swinging Strokes mash-up."

== Music video ==
The music video consists of performances from Pink's I'm Not Dead Tour. The video mostly includes shots of performances of "Leave Me Alone (I'm Lonely)", but it also includes clips of performances of songs such as "Stupid Girls", "Fingers", "The One That Got Away" and "U + Ur Hand".

=== The Funhouse Freakshow Edition ===
During the Funhouse Summer Carnival Tour, alternate videos were shot for "Funhouse," "Please Don't Leave Me" and "Leave Me Alone (I'm Lonely)." The video was directed by Cole Walliser.

== Track listing ==
- Australian CD single
1. "Leave Me Alone (I'm Lonely)" – 3:18
2. "Dear Mr. President" (live from Wembley Arena) – 4:49
3. "Who Knew" (live from Wembley Arena) – 3:26
4. "Leave Me Alone (I'm Lonely)" (live from Wembley Arena)
5. "Live from Wembley Arena – London, England" (trailer)

== Personnel ==
- Vocals: Pink
- Backing vocals: Pink and Butch Walker
- Mixed by: Tom Lord-Alge
- Assisted by: Femio Hermandez
- Additional programming: Butch Walker
- Drum/Keyboard programming: Dan Chase
- Drums: Mylious Johnson
- Guitars: Butch Walker
- Bass: Butch Walker

== Charts ==
=== Weekly charts ===
Weekly chart performance for "Leave Me Alone (I'm Lonely)"
Chart (2007)	Peak position
Australia (ARIA)	5
CIS Airplay (TopHit)	78
Croatia International Airplay (HRT)	19
New Zealand (Recorded Music NZ)	5
Romania (Romanian Top 100)	44
Russia Airplay (TopHit)	73
Slovakia Airplay (ČNS IFPI)	11
UK Singles (Official Charts)	34
Ukraine Airplay (TopHit)	130

=== Year-end charts ===
Year-end chart performance for "Leave Me Alone (I'm Lonely)"
Chart (2007)	Position
Australia (ARIA)	35
Croatia International Airplay (HRT)	49
New Zealand (RIANZ)	24

== Certifications ==
Certifications and sales for "Leave Me Alone (I'm Lonely)"
Region	Certification	Certified units/sales
Australia (ARIA)	2× Platinum	140,000^{‡}
New Zealand (RMNZ)	Gold	7,500^{*}
United Kingdom (BPI)	Silver	200,000^{‡}
^{*} Sales figures based on certification alone.^{‡} Sales+streaming figures based on certification alone.

== Release history ==
Release dates and formats for "Leave Me Alone (I'm Lonely)"
Region	Date	Format(s)	Label(s)	Ref.
United Kingdom	March 12, 2007	Digital download	LaFace	
Australia	April 24, 2007	Digital download (EP)	Sony BMG	
Australia	April 28, 2007	CD	Sony BMG	
