= Live from Wembley =

Live from Wembley or Live from Wembley Arena may refer to:

- Girls Aloud: The Greatest Hits Live from Wembley Arena, a 2006 DVD
- Pink: Live from Wembley Arena, a 2007 DVD

== See also ==
- Live at Wembley (disambiguation)
