= Live at Wembley =

Live at Wembley or Live at Wembley Stadium may refer to:

- Live at Wembley (Meat Loaf album), 1987
- Live at Wembley (Beyoncé Knowles album), 2004
- Live at Wembley (Bad Company album), 2011
- Live at Wembley (Alter Bridge DVD), 2012
- Live at Wembley (Bring Me the Horizon album), 2015
- Live at Wembley (Babymetal album), 2016
- Live at Wembley '86, a 1992 album by Queen
- Live at Wembley '78, a 1998 album by Electric Light Orchestra
- Live at Wembley July 16, 1988, a 2012 DVD by Michael Jackson
- Live at Wembley Arena, a 2014 album by ABBA
- Live at Wembley Stadium (album), a 2024 album by Blur
- Live at Wembley Stadium (Spice Girls DVD), 1998
- Genesis Live at Wembley Stadium, 2003
- Live at Wembley Stadium (Foo Fighters DVD), 2008

== See also ==
- Live from Wembley (disambiguation)
