= I'm Not Dead =

2006 studio album by Pink

Studio album by Pink
- Released: March 31, 2006
- Recorded: December 2004 – July 2005
- Studios: Magic Shop (New York City, New York); Turtle Sound (New York City); Conway (Los Angeles, California); House of Blues Studios (West Hollywood, California); Chateau Marmont (Los Angeles); The Steakhouse (Los Angeles); Tree Sound Studios (Norcross, Georgia); Remote Control (Santa Monica, California); Pulse Studios (Los Angeles); Phantom Studios (Los Angeles); The Studio (Philadelphia, Pennsylvania); Fishhead Music (Gothenburg, Sweden); Echo Studios (Los Angeles)
- Genres: Pop; pop rock
- Length: 54:07
- Labels: LaFace; Zomba; RCA (reissue)
- Producers: Pink; Josh Abraham; Al Clay; Dr. Luke; Mike Elizondo; Greg Kurstin; Billy Mann; MachoPsycho; Max Martin; Chris Rojas; Butch Walker

Pink chronology
Try This (2003)	I'm Not Dead (2006)	The Remixes (2007)

Singles from I'm Not Dead
- 1. "Stupid Girls" Released: February 7, 2006; 2. "Who Knew" Released: May 8, 2006; 3. "U + Ur Hand" Released: August 28, 2006; 4. "Nobody Knows" Released: November 20, 2006; 5. "Leave Me Alone (I'm Lonely)" Released: March 12, 2007; 6. "Dear Mr. President" Released: April 2, 2007

I'm Not Dead is the fourth studio album by American singer-songwriter Pink. It was released on March 31, 2006, by LaFace Records and Zomba Group. Following the commercial underperformance of her third studio album Try This (2003), Pink parted ways with Arista Records and began experimenting with new sounds and collaborating with new producers, and stated she named the album after having an epiphany about adult responsibilities and the realities of everyday life. Pink served as the executive producer of the project and contributions to the album's production came from several producers including Billy Mann, Butch Walker, Dr. Luke and Max Martin.

Commercially, I'm Not Dead peaked at number six on the Billboard 200 chart in the United States, and reached number one in several territories including Australia, Austria, Germany, New Zealand, and Switzerland. I'm Not Dead has since been certified double platinum in the United States and certified gold in Finland, Denmark, and Sweden. The album received positive reviews from music critics, many of whom complimented the risks Pink took on the record as well as her experimentation with rock music.

"Stupid Girls" was released as the lead single from I'm Not Dead ahead of the album's release, which generated controversy for its lyrical content and music video, for which Pink received the MTV Video Music Award for Best Pop Video and a nomination for the Grammy Award for Best Female Pop Vocal Performance. Five additional singles were released from the album, with "Who Knew" and "U + Ur Hand" reaching the top 10 of the Billboard Hot 100 chart in the United States. Pink promoted the album through radio and television interviews, media appearances, and the I'm Not Dead Tour.

== Background ==
Following the release of her third studio album Try This (2003), which underperformed commercially and would later become her lowest-selling record, Pink parted ways with Arista Records, the label that released Try This and her second studio album Missundaztood (2001). In 2006, she stated that she was unhappy with the way the label wanted her to produce music after the success of Missundaztood, saying: "I was kind of rebelling against the label on that one. I was going: 'You want a record? Fine, I'll write 10 songs in a week for your fuckin' record and you can press it up and put it out.'" She described the promotional campaign for Try This as "an awful time", stating she walked out of several interviews crying and she felt they were "putting a quarter in the slot to watch the monkey dance." Pink described the decision to name her fourth studio album I'm Not Dead in several interviews, telling CBS News that "it's about being alive and feisty and not sitting down and shutting up even though people would like you to." In other interviews, she stated that the title came from an "awakening", telling The Independent that she was influenced by her father having a heart attack and turning 25, saying she "started caring less about [her] drama and more about the world around [her]." Pink also described the album's title as being inspired by an epiphany where she "just kind of woke up and realized" she had a lot to learn about adult responsibilities and the realities of everyday life. Whereas she described the recording process for Try This as draining, she stated that she was "forced to be almost emotionally involved" by her collaborators on I'm Not Dead, saying: "I guess I was just kind of at that place where I felt like I kind of had something to add to the world. I feel like there's a hole and I know how to fill it, people aren't talking trash anymore. I was just feeling really creative and really emotionally available again, and it came out great." According to Pink, she wrote more than forty songs for the album on "everything [she] could possibly think of."

== Musical styles and themes ==
Primarily a pop and pop rock album, I'm Not Dead also includes acoustic, folk rock, hard rock, power pop, folk pop, new wave, dance, soul and hip-hop elements.

Pink was inspired to write opening track "Stupid Girls", in which she deplores the lack of good role models for young girls while encouraging them to cultivate independence, after she noticed many such girls aspire to be like female pop icons, particularly those near her Los Angeles home. "There's a certain thing the world is being fed, and my point is there should be a choice", Pink said. She stated that "Who Knew" is about "the death of friendship", as well as friends of hers who died as a result of drug overdoses. The song is about several people. The third song, "Long Way to Happy", is based on a poem about sexual abuse Pink wrote when she was thirteen years old. "I know a lot of people that have been abused and/or molested and/or fucked over by someone close to them. And I'm no exception. And that's that song", she said. The ballad "Nobody Knows" describes feelings that one can have but not show to the outside world, and Pink has named it the most vulnerable track on the album. "Dear Mr. President" is an open letter to then president of the United States, George W. Bush; the song's format is a series of rhetorical questions for the President, specifically pertaining to how he really feels about issues such as war, homosexuality, homelessness and drug abuse.

According to Pink, the sixth and title track, "I'm Not Dead", is her first "subtle" and "poetic" self-written song: "Usually it's very much more cartoon-y and blunt, the way I write songs. I don't really know diplomacy or subtlety." The song was inspired by how Pink and producer Billy Mann felt about the end of their working relationship: "We were scared to move on from each other, after seeing how much that little bit of time together changed us, and how scary change is." In "'Cuz I Can", Pink says she plays by her own rules and boasts about her "bling", a contrast to the anti-consumerist content of "Stupid Girls". Referring to the song, she called herself "a walking contradiction" and "a hypocrite sometimes." This theme is echoed in "Leave Me Alone (I'm Lonely)", which deals with contradictory feelings about a relationship; Pink said "That's how I live my life. I'm a walking conflict." She called the song "a funny take on 'I love you' ... I get really cramped ... But, every girl needs her space". "U + Ur Hand", the ninth track, is a kiss-off song addressed to a man who is trying to seduce Pink; it became a fan favorite before the release of the album, when it was leaked to the internet. Pink said of song such as "Runaway" that "It's been especially hard for [my parents] hearing me write about things they never knew about ... My mom's like, 'Were you really that angry? Was I really that in denial? Was I really that bad a parent?' 'No, Mom - you were great. You didn't try to run me over with your car. I made it up.' But by writing all of it down and sharing it with the world, I've broken with most of it." "The One That Got Away" is, as Pink puts it, "the classic 'Is this the one? Or is the grass really greener?'" Pink described track thirteen, "Conversations with My 13 Year Old Self", as a "huge therapy session" that addresses her "pissed-off, complicated" younger self. She said of writing the song, "I needed a hug, and I get it ... now. If I tried to hug my 13-year-old self, she'd try to kick my ass, and then she'd collapse and cry." "Fingers" is about her videotaping herself masturbating. She said she probably didn't need to add to the number of songs about masturbation, but she couldn't help herself. The final song on the album, the hidden track "I Have Seen the Rain," was written by and features Pink's father, James T. Moore. He wrote it when he was a soldier in the Vietnam War, but according to Pink "it's still relevant today. It's a soldier's cry." She had always wanted to record it with him and learnt to harmonize with it. She said of its recording, "He was so nervous, it was the most adorable experience for a father and daughter to share."

== Promotion ==
=== Singles ===
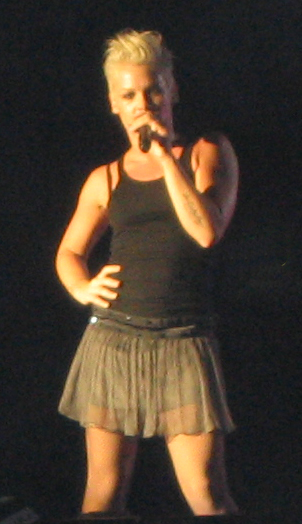
Pink performing in October 2006 on the I'm Not Dead Tour

Before "Stupid Girls" was chosen as the album's lead single, videos were shot for it and "U + Ur Hand", which became the third single.

Released in February – March 2006, "Stupid Girls" reached number 13 on the U.S. Billboard Hot 100—becoming Pink's biggest hit since 2002—and the top five in the UK and Australia. It was the subject of considerable discussion, with Pink attending The Oprah Winfrey Show to discuss what she called the "stupid girl epidemic"; in the song, she deplores the lack of good role models for girls while encouraging them to cultivate independence. The song was nominated for a Grammy Award for Best Female Pop Vocal Performance (see Grammy Awards of 2007). Its music video, directed by Dave Meyers, received an MTV Video Music Award for Best Pop Video.

"Who Knew" was released as the second single in May 2006 and initially failed to chart on the U.S. Billboard Hot 100, but it later debuted on the chart in March 2007 after it was used in promotion for the ABC television show October Road. It was re-released in the U.S. in June 2007, and had peaked at number nine by mid September. It reached the top ten in other countries, including Australia and the UK.

The third single, "U + Ur Hand", initially took three months to chart on the Hot 100, but it went on to peak at number nine in April 2007. It reached the top 20 across most of Europe and Australia through August – September 2006.

The fourth single, "Nobody Knows", was released outside the U.S. in November and reached the top 40 in the UK and Australia.

The song "Dear Mr. President" attracted publicity, and there was belief among fans that it would be released as a single, but Pink said she would not release "Dear Mr. President" as a single because she did not want people to think it was a publicity stunt. In Belgium, an acoustic version of the song was released as a download single in late 2006, and it reached number one on the Ultratop chart. In the UK, "Dear Mr. President" was released as a download-only single with "Leave Me Alone (I'm Lonely)". It reached the UK top 40, also charting in the top five in Australia, where it became the fifth top five hit from I'm Not Dead.

=== I'm Not Dead Tour ===
Pink began her North American I'm Not Dead Tour on June 24, 2006, in Chicago and it ended in Dallas after twenty shows. She started her European tour on September 8 of the same year in Istanbul; it ran for 52 shows and was scheduled to end in Milan on December 21. A DVD of a concert on this leg of the tour, Pink: Live from Wembley Arena, was released in April 2007. In 2007, Pink returned to the U.S. to accompany Justin Timberlake on his FutureSex/LoveShow tour. She began her sold-out Australian tour in April 2007. The Australian leg of the tour was set at a record-breaking 35 arena shows, selling around 307,000 tickets — it became the most successful arena tour in Australian history by a female artist in Australia. Sony BMG Australia released a special tour edition of I'm Not Dead on March 17, 2007—it contains the original album including two bonus tracks and a DVD that features live performances and music videos. That December, the Special Edition was released in the U.S. under the title Platinum Edition. It featured additional DVD content not featured on the Australian version.

== Critical reception ==
Professional ratings
Aggregate scores
Source	Rating
Metacritic	70/100
Review scores
Source	Rating
AllMusic	4/5 stars
Blender	3/5 stars
Entertainment Weekly	B+
The Guardian	3/5 stars
Los Angeles Times	3/4 stars
PopMatters	8/10
Q	3/5 stars
Rolling Stone	3.5/5 stars
Uncut	3/5 stars
The Village Voice	A−

I'm Not Dead had a highly positive critical reception, receiving a 70 out of 100 score on Metacritic. In his review for AllMusic, Stephen Thomas Erlewine commented that P!nk "sounds liberated, making music that's far riskier and stranger than anything else in mainstream pop in 2006". Rolling Stone's review was also complimentary, stating that the album "swaggers with a cockiness that most dudes in bands can't match. Whether she sings rock, pop, R&B or her usual combination of all three, the twenty-six-year-old Doylestown, Pennsylvania, native is belting more urgently and taking more risks than her pop-radio contemporaries."

Pink received the 2006 Glamour Magazine award for International Solo Artist of the Year, and in 2007, she won the MTV Australia Video Music Award for Best Female Artist and the Nickelodeon Kids' Choice Award (in Australia) for Favourite International. The same year, the album won in the Best International Album category at the Rockbjörnen Awards.

== Commercial performance ==
The album sold 126,000 copies in its first week in the U.S. and debuted at number six, a higher debut position than those of Pink's last two albums, Missundaztood (2001) and Try This (2003); however, first-week sales for I'm Not Dead were lower. I'm Not Dead spent a total of 88 non-consecutive weeks on the chart, its last being in December 2009. I'm Not Dead debuted at number three in the United Kingdom selling 39,892 copies and was the ninth best-selling album of 2006 in the UK, with over 848,000 copies sold in the year. In October 2007, it re-entered the UK top 100 album chart at 99.

In Australia, after 26 weeks of release, I'm Not Dead ascended to number one to become Pink's first number-one album; it returned to number one in its 61st week on the Australian ARIA chart. The album spent a record 62 consecutive weeks in the top ten. It was the second best selling album of both 2006 and 2007, and the number-one selling album by an American or a female artist in each year. It also became one of two Pink albums on the ARIA Chart's top 100 selling albums of the 2000 to 2009 decade, positioned at number 3 behind her 11× Platinum album Funhouse. In Canada, the album debuted at number two with 13,000 copies sold in its first week, and the CRIA certified it platinum for shipments of more than 100,000 copies. In Germany, it became Pink's first number-one album. "I'm Not Dead" debuted at the summit as well as in Switzerland, in Austria and in Greece, debuted in the top five in Norway and Finland then earned a top ten in France, Belgium and Sweden, the album being certified Platinum in both of the former countries.

== Track listing ==
I'm Not Dead – Standard edition
No.	Title	Writer(s)	Producer(s)	Length
1.	"Stupid Girls"	Pink; Billy Mann; Nikey Olovson; Robin Lynch	Mann; MachoPsycho^{[a]}	3:17
2.	"Who Knew"	Pink; Max Martin; Lukasz Gottwald	Martin; Dr. Luke	3:28
3.	"Long Way to Happy"	Pink; Butch Walker	Walker	3:49
4.	"Nobody Knows"	Pink; Mann	Mann	3:59
5.	"Dear Mr. President" (featuring Indigo Girls)	Pink; Mann	Mann; Pink	4:33
6.	"I'm Not Dead"	Pink; Mann	Al Clay; Mann	3:46
7.	"'Cuz I Can"	Pink; Martin; Gottwald	Martin; Dr. Luke	3:43
8.	"Leave Me Alone (I'm Lonely)"	Pink; Walker	Walker	3:18
9.	"U + Ur Hand"	Pink; Martin; Gottwald; Rami	Martin; Dr. Luke	3:34
10.	"Runaway"	Pink; Mann	Josh Abraham; Mann	4:23
11.	"The One That Got Away"	Pink; Mann	Mann; Pink	4:42
12.	"I Got Money Now"	Pink; Mike Elizondo	Elizondo	3:55
13.	"Conversations with My 13 Year Old Self"	Pink; Mann	Mann	3:50
14.	"I Have Seen the Rain" (featuring Jim Moore) (hidden track)	Jim Moore	Pink	3:30
Total length:				54:07

I'm Not Dead – International bonus track
No.	Title	Writer(s)	Producer(s)	Length
14.	"Fingers"	Pink; Mann	Mann; Chris Rojas^{[a]}	3:42
15.	"I Have Seen the Rain" (featuring Jim Moore; hidden track)	Moore	Pink	3:30
Total length:				57:49

I'm Not Dead – UK bonus tracks
No.	Title	Writer(s)	Producer(s)	Length
14.	"Fingers"	Pink; Mann	Mann; Rojas^{[a]}	3:42
15.	"Centerfold"	Pink; Cathy Dennis; Greg Kurstin	Kurstin	3:20
16.	"I Have Seen the Rain" (featuring Jim Moore; hidden track)	Moore	Pink	3:30
Total length:				61:09

I'm Not Dead – iTunes Store bonus tracks
No.	Title	Writer(s)	Producer(s)	Length
15.	"Crash & Burn"	Pink; Mann	Mann; Chris Rojas^{[a]}	4:26
16.	"Centerfold"	Pink; Dennis; Kurstin	Kurstin	3:20
17.	"Fingers"	Pink; Mann	Mann; Chris Rojas^{[a]}	3:42
Total length:				65:15

I'm Not Dead – Australian tour edition bonus tracks
No.	Title	Length
14.	"Fingers"	3:42
15.	"I Have Seen the Rain" (featuring James T. Moore)	3:33
16.	"Who Knew" (Bimbo Jones Radio Edit)	3:27
17.	"U + Ur Hand" (Beatcult Remix)	6:40
Total length:		67:59

I'm Not Dead – Platinum edition bonus tracks
No.	Title	Writer(s)	Length
15.	"Heartbreaker"	Pink; Kara DioGuardi; Greg Wells	3:10
16.	"Centerfold"		3:21
17.	"Fingers"		3:42
18.	"U + Ur Hand" (Bimbo Jones Remix)		3:48
Total length:			68:08

I'm Not Dead – Australian tour edition DVD
No.	Title	Length
1.	"Stupid Girls" (Music Video)
2.	"Who Knew" (Music Video)
3.	"U + Ur Hand" (Music Video)
4.	"Nobody Knows" (Music Video)
5.	"Dear Mr. President" (Live from Wembley Arena)
6.	"Leave Me Alone (I'm Lonely)" (Live from Wembley Arena)
7.	"Stupid Girls" (The Making of the Video)
8.	"U + Ur Hand" (The Making of the Video)

I'm Not Dead – platinum edition DVD
No.	Title	Length
1.	"Stupid Girls" (The Making of the Video)
2.	"Stupid Girls" (Music Video)
3.	"U + Ur Hand" (The Making of the Video)
4.	"U + Ur Hand" (Music Video)
5.	"Who Knew" (Music Video)
6.	"Nobody Knows" (Music Video)
7.	"U + Ur Hand" (Live from Wembley Arena)
8.	"Who Knew" (Live from Wembley Arena)
9.	"Dear Mr. President" (Live from Wembley Arena)
10.	"Just Like a Pill" (Live from Wembley Arena)
11.	"Dear Mr. President" (In-Studio Performance)

I'm Not Dead – DualDisc DVD side
No.	Title	Length
1.	"Entire Album in 5.1 Surround Sound"
2.	"P!nk - Live in Europe" (Trailer)
3.	"Interview with P!nk"
4.	"P!nk Presents: The Stupid Girls"
5.	"Stupid Girls" (Music Video)
6.	"Stupid Girls" (Video Outtakes and Bloopers)

Notes

- ^{^[a]} signifies a co-producer.

== Personnel ==
Credits adapted from the liner notes of I'm Not Dead.

- Pink – producer, vocals, backing vocals, keyboard, piano
- Adem Hawkins – song mixing
- Al Clay – song mixing
- Amy Ray – backing vocals
- Andy Timmons – guitars
- Beth Cohen – backing vocals
- Billy Mann – backing vocals, guitars, piano, orchestra arranged, drums
- Butch Walker – backing vocals, additional programming, guitars, bass guitar
- Christopher Rojas – mixing, keyboard programming, violins, drum programming, guitars, bass guitar, backing vocals
- Dan Chase – keyboard programming, drum programming
- Dan Warner – electric guitars
- Emily Saliers – backing vocals, guitars
- Fermio Hernandez – assistant mix engineer
- Geoff Zanelli – guitars, bass guitar, synthesizer
- Jay Graham - guitars, backing vocals
- Jeff Phillips – guitars
- Joey Waronker – drums
- John Hanes – additional Pro Tools engineer
- Justin Meldal-Johnsen – bass guitar
- Lasse Mårtén – drums
- Lee Levin – drums
- Leon Pendarvis – orchestra arrangements, conductor
- Lukasz Gottwald – guitar programming, drum programming
- Max Martin – keyboard programming, guitar programming, drum programming
- Mike Elizondo – additional programming, keyboard programming, keyboard, guitars
- Niklas Olovson – drum programming, bass guitar
- Molecules – guest MC
- Mylious Johnson – drums
- Pete Wallace – keyboard programming, drum programming, guitars, piano, percussion
- Rafael Moreira – guitars
- Robin Lynch – guitars
- Roc Raida – DJ
- Serban Ghenea – song mixing
- Shawn Pelton – drums
- Steven Wolf – additional programming, tambourine
- Tim Roberts – assistant mix engineer
- Tom Lord-Alge – song mixing
- Tom Talomaa – assistant mix engineer
- Tom Coyne – mastering
- Thom Cadley – 5.1 mixing
- Mark Rinaldi – assistant 5.1 mixing
- Mark Wilder – 5.1 mastering

== Charts ==
=== Weekly charts ===
Chart (2006)	Peak position
Australian Albums (ARIA)	1
Austrian Albums (Ö3 Austria)	1
Belgian Albums (Ultratop Flanders)	3
Belgian Albums (Ultratop Wallonia)	8
Canadian Albums (Billboard)	2
Croatian International Albums (HDU)	9
Danish Albums (Hitlisten)	13
Dutch Albums (Album Top 100)	5
Finnish Albums (Suomen virallinen lista)	3
French Albums (SNEP)	7
German Albums (Offizielle Top 100)	1
Hungarian Albums (MAHASZ)	9
Irish Albums (IRMA)	9
Italian Albums (FIMI)	31
Japanese Albums (Oricon)	19
New Zealand Albums (RMNZ)	1
Norwegian Albums (VG-lista)	4
Polish Albums (ZPAV)	39
Portuguese Albums (AFP)	28
Scottish Albums (Official Charts)	5
South African Albums (RISA)	5
Spanish Albums (Promusicae)	73
Swedish Albums (Sverigetopplistan)	7
Swiss Albums (Schweizer Hitparade)	1
UK Albums (Official Charts)	3
US Billboard 200	6
US Indie Store Album Sales (Billboard)	9

=== Year-end charts ===
Chart (2006)	Position
Australian Albums (ARIA)	2
Austrian Albums (Ö3 Austria)	9
Belgian Albums (Ultratop Flanders)	33
Belgian Albums (Ultratop Wallonia)	86
Finnish Albums (Suomen virallinen lista)	12
French Albums (SNEP)	46
German Albums (Offizielle Top 100)	9
Swedish Albums (Sverigetopplistan)	19
Swiss Albums (Schweizer Hitparade)	8
UK Albums (OCC)	9
US Billboard 200	130
Worldwide	17
Chart (2007)	Position
Australian Albums (ARIA)	2
Austrian Albums (Ö3 Austria)	10
Belgian Albums (Ultratop Flanders)	32
French Albums (SNEP)	49
German Albums (Offizielle Top 100)	7
New Zealand Albums (RMNZ)	10
Swiss Albums (Schweizer Hitparade)	22
UK Albums (OCC)	46
US Billboard 200	96
Chart (2008)	Position
Australian Albums (ARIA)	36
UK Albums (OCC)	199
Chart (2009)	Position
Australian Albums (ARIA)	24

=== Decade-end charts ===
Chart (2000–2009)	Position
Australian Albums (ARIA)	3
Austrian Albums (Ö3 Austria)	12
UK Albums (OCC)	88

== Certifications ==
Certifications and sales
Region	Certification	Certified units/sales
Australia (ARIA)	12× Platinum	840,000^{‡}
Austria (IFPI Austria)	2× Platinum	60,000^{*}
Belgium (BRMA)	Platinum	50,000^{*}
Canada (Music Canada)	2× Platinum	200,000^{^}
Denmark (IFPI Danmark)	Gold	20,000^{^}
Finland (Musiikkituottajat)	Gold	16,085
France (SNEP)	Platinum	200,000^{*}
Germany (BVMI)	7× Gold	700,000^{^}
Hungary (MAHASZ)	Platinum	10,000^{^}
Ireland (IRMA)	3× Platinum	45,000^{^}
Netherlands (NVPI)	Gold	35,000^{^}
New Zealand (RMNZ)	2× Platinum	30,000^{^}
Russia (NFPF)	2× Platinum	40,000^{*}
South Korea	—	1,891
Sweden (GLF)	Gold	30,000^{^}
Switzerland (IFPI Switzerland)	2× Platinum	60,000^{^}
United Kingdom (BPI)	4× Platinum	1,284,026
United States (RIAA)	2× Platinum	2,000,000^{^}
Summaries
Europe (IFPI)	2× Platinum	2,000,000^{*}
^{*} Sales figures based on certification alone.^{^} Shipments figures based on certification alone.^{‡} Sales+streaming figures based on certification alone.

== Release history ==
Release dates and formats
Region	Date	Edition(s)	Format(s)	Label(s)	Ref.
Germany	March 31, 2006	Standard; limited	CD; DualDisc	Sony BMG	
Australia	April 1, 2006	Standard	CD	Sony BMG	
United Kingdom	April 3, 2006	Standard; limited	CD; DualDisc	LaFace	
South Korea	April 4, 2006	Limited	CD+DVD	Sony BMG	
United States	April 4, 2006	Standard; limited	CD; DualDisc	LaFace	
Australia	April 8, 2006	Limited	DualDisc	Sony BMG	
Japan	April 26, 2006	Standard	CD	BMG Japan	
Japan	May 24, 2006	Limited	CD+DVD	BMG Japan	
Australia	March 17, 2007	Tour	CD+DVD	Sony BMG	
United States	December 11, 2007	Platinum	CD+DVD	LaFace	
Various	May 4, 2018	Standard	Vinyl	RCA; Legacy	

== The Remixes ==
The Remixes

Remix album by Pink
- Released: February 20, 2007
- Genre: EDM
- Length: 33:31
- Labels: LaFace; Jive
- Producers: Bimbo Jones; BeatCult; Jonathan Harvey; The Sharp Boys; Junior Vasquez; Noize Trip

Pink chronology
I'm Not Dead (2006)	The Remixes (2007)	Funhouse (2008)

The Remixes is the first extended play and the first remix album by Pink. It was released on February 20, 2007 for digital download only and contains the remixes of each of the first three singles from I'm Not Dead.

=== Tracklisting ===
The Remixes track listing
No.	Title	Remix	Length
1.	"U + Ur Hand"	Bimbo Jones Remix	8:15
2.	"U + Ur Hand"	Beatcult Remix	6:39
3.	"Who Knew"	The Bimbo Jones Radio Edit	3:26
4.	"Who Knew"	Sharp Boys Jonathan Harvey Remix	8:38
5.	"Stupid Girls"	Junior Vasquez & Dynamix Remix - Club Mix	4:00
6.	"Stupid Girls"	Noize Trip Remix	3:13
Total length:			33:31

== See also ==
- List of best-selling albums in Australia
