= Nobody Knows (Pink song) =

2006 single by Pink

Single by Pink

from the album I'm Not Dead
- B-side: "Words"
- Released: November 20, 2006
- Studio: The Steakhouse (Los Angeles); Turtle Sound (New York City)
- Length: 3:59
- Label: LaFace
- Songwriters: Pink; Billy Mann
- Producer: Billy Mann

Pink singles chronology
"U + Ur Hand" (2006)	"Nobody Knows" (2006)	"Leave Me Alone (I'm Lonely)" (2007)

Music video
- "Nobody Knows" on YouTube

"Nobody Knows" is a song by American singer-songwriter Pink, released as the fourth single from her fourth album, I'm Not Dead (2006). It was released on November 20, 2006, in Britain and during January 2007 in Australia and Germany.

== Composition and critical reception ==
"Nobody Knows" was written by Pink and co-written and produced by Billy Mann. The song is a piano-ballad and deals with her feelings of depression. The song received positive reviews. IGN's wrote that "'Nobody Knows' goes for a shiny blues ballad feel, Pink flexing her vocal chords to reveal a downright sweetness to her voice." Quentin Huff from PopMatters wrote an extensive review about the song, stating that "Even when you feel like you’ve heard it before, her smoky vocals and clever touches let you know it’s not the same old thing." While commenting about her voice, he said that she "belts out her lyrics like a champ." Entertainment Weekly's Chris Willman wrote that the song can be skipped while listening to the album, while referring the track as a "stab at Xtina-style balladic solipsism, Pink's vocal span from G3 to G5"

== Commercial release ==
The song was released as a single on November 20, 2006, in the United Kingdom and Ireland, and on January 13, 2007, in Australia; it reached number 27 in all three countries. It was the only physical single from I'm Not Dead to miss the top five on the ARIA Singles Chart, on which it reached its peak in late January 2007, but it was very popular on radio. Two weeks before this, "Who Knew" (the second I'm Not Dead single) had re-entered the chart and "U + Ur Hand" was still on the chart, which meant that three singles by Pink were in the top fifty (as of January 21, 2007). On the UK Singles Chart it was Pink's lowest peaking single at the time, and the first I'm Not Dead single to miss the top ten.

"Nobody Knows" reached number 17 in Germany and number 74 on the Eurochart Hot 100 Singles chart. Although it reached the top 40 on the majority of charts on which it appeared, it was not as successful as the album's preceding singles. In Canada the song was released to radio in mid-January shortly after the success of "U + Ur Hand"; in Belgium "Dear Mr. President" was the fourth single from the album.

== Music video ==
The music video was shot in London by director Jake Nava. The first scene features Pink in a hotel room (shot in The May Fair hotel) staring out of a window to London at night, that changes to sunrise. She then watches TV but finds there's hardly anything on apart from a melting snowman and puts her head under her pillow before accessing her laptop computer. During the video she messes up the room by throwing everything around, and she is later seen sitting in the fetal position in a shower. Another scene shows Pink walking down a street, past a couple in love and some drunken men. The video ends with Pink singing to an empty auditorium, pretending to do a real performance.

== Use in singing competitions ==
The song enjoys great popularity within contestants of TV singing competitions. The song was used in 2007 by Natalie Gauci as her Top 3 performance during Australian Idol's Season 5. The song was sung in 2009 by Rachel Adedeji sixth series of The X Factor. It was covered in week 3 of the seventh series of The X Factor by the boyband One Direction in 2010. In 2011, LeRoy Bell of The X Factor USA's first season covered the song during Top 17 Performance. It was also covered by Jade Richards as well as Amelia Lily Oliver for Bootcamp Stage 2 during eighth series of The X Factor UK. Most recently, it was covered by Jessica Espinoza during her audition for the second season of The X Factor USA.

== Personnel ==
- Vocals: Pink
- Backing vocals: Billy Mann, Beth Cohen
- Mixed by: Tom Lord-Alge
- Assistant mix engineer: Fermio Hernandez
- Keyboard programming: Pete Wallace
- Electric guitars: Dan Warner
- Guitars: Pete Wallace, Billy Mann
- Piano: Pete Wallace, Billy Mann
- Drums: Lee Levin
- Percussion: Pete Wallace
- Production coordinator: Lana Israel

== Charts ==
Chart (2006–2007)	Peak position
Australia (ARIA)	27
Austria (Ö3 Austria Top 40)	21
Belgium (Ultratip Bubbling Under Flanders)	23
France (SNEP)	18
Germany (GfK)	17
Germany Airplay (BVMI)	3
Ireland (IRMA)	27
Netherlands (Dutch Top 40)	38
Netherlands (Single Top 100)	45
Scottish Singles Sales (Official Charts)	15
Switzerland (Schweizer Hitparade)	17
UK Singles (Official Charts)	27
Ukraine Airplay (TopHit)	111

== Certifications ==
Region	Certification	Certified units/sales
Australia (ARIA)	Gold	35,000^{‡}
^{‡} Sales+streaming figures based on certification alone.

== Release history ==
Release dates and formats for "Nobody Knows"
Region	Date	Format(s)	Label(s)	Ref.
United Kingdom	November 20, 2006	CD; digital download	RCA	
Germany	January 12, 2007	CD	Sony BMG	
Australia	January 15, 2007	CD	Sony BMG	
France	April 30, 2007	CD	Sony BMG	
