= 'Cuz I Can (Pink song) =

2007 promotional single by Pink

Promotional single by Pink

from the album I'm Not Dead
- Released: October 4, 2007
- Studio: Conway (Los Angeles)
- Length: 3:43
- Label: LaFace
- Songwriters: Pink; Max Martin; Lukasz Gottwald
- Producer: Max Martin

"'Cuz I Can" is a song by American singer Pink from her fourth studio album, I'm Not Dead (2006). It was written by Pink, Max Martin and Lukasz Gottwald, and produced by Martin. One of the five tracks from I'm Not Dead to prematurely leak onto the Internet in July 2005, the song was ultimately released as a promotional single in select countries on October 4, 2007, by LaFace Records.

== Lyrics and composition ==
Lyrically, the song is about Pink playing by her own rules, and boasting about her "bling", a contrast to the anti-consumerist content of "Stupid Girls", another track on the album. Referring to "'Cuz I Can", she called herself "a walking contradiction" and "a hypocrite sometimes."

== Commercial performance ==
In Australia, "'Cuz I Can" debuted at number 33 on the ARIA Digital Tracks chart and peaked at number 14; it failed to enter the main singles chart due to its digital download-only release. In New Zealand, the song debuted at number 39 and peaked at number 29 in its fourth week.

== Music video ==
The official music video for the song was first seen on Australian television on October 5, 2007, and footage of a live performance from the I'm Not Dead Tour. The performance, which was the show opener for the tour, featured dancers dressed like monks and with only underwear beneath their robes.

== Charts ==
Weekly chart performance for "'Cuz I Can"
| Chart (2007–2008) | Peak position |
|---|---|
| Australian Digital Tracks (ARIA) | 14 |
| CIS Airplay (TopHit) | 39 |
| New Zealand (Recorded Music NZ) | 29 |
| Russia Airplay (TopHit) | 33 |
| Ukraine Airplay (TopHit) | 193 |

== Certifications ==
Certifications for "'Cuz I Can"
| Region | Certification | Certified units/sales |
|---|---|---|
| Australia (ARIA) | Platinum | 70,000^{‡} |
^{‡} Sales+streaming figures based on certification alone.
