= Dear Mr. President (Pink song) =

2006 single by Pink

Single by Pink featuring Indigo Girls

from the album I'm Not Dead
- A-side: "Leave Me Alone (I'm Lonely)"
- Released: April 2, 2007
- Studio: Magic Shop (New York City); Three Sound (Norcross, Georgia)
- Length: 4:33
- Label: LaFace
- Songwriters: Pink; Billy Mann
- Producers: Pink; Billy Mann

Pink singles chronology
"Leave Me Alone (I'm Lonely)" (2007)	"Dear Mr. President" (2007)	"'Cuz I Can" (2007)

Indigo Girls singles chronology
"Peace Tonight" (1999)	"Dear Mr. President" (2006)	"What Are You Like" (2009)

"Dear Mr. President" is a song recorded by American singer Pink, featuring the Indigo Girls, for her fourth studio album I'm Not Dead (2006). It was written and produced by Pink and Billy Mann. The song is an open letter to the then-President of the United States, George W. Bush, criticizing several areas of his administration and terms in office, including the Iraq War, No Child Left Behind Act, opposition to same-sex marriage and LGBT rights in general, perceived lack of empathy for poor and middle-class citizens, and his drinking and drug usage in college. Pink felt that it was one of the most important songs she had ever written.

Critically acclaimed, "Dear Mr. President" was released as the sixth and final international single from I'm Not Dead on April 2, 2007, by LaFace Records. A commercial success, it peaked atop the charts in Austria and Flanders while reaching the top five in Australia, the Czech Republic, Germany and Switzerland.

== Critical response ==
"Dear Mr. President" received mostly positive reviews from music critics. Entertainment Weekly's Chris Williams described the song "with its incongruous folkie social concern and Bush-baiting applause lines". The Los Angeles Times' Natalie Nichols said that Pink taps her inner Ani DiFranco on the confrontational "Dear Mr. President". The New York Times' Jon Pareles noted that the song is "well meaning", "hectoring" and that it "grow[s] even more sententious". PopMatters praised the single with long overview:

Oh, and speaking of presidents, Pink's musical letter to the Commander-in-Chief ("Dear Mr. President") is just as topical. The Indigo Girls tag along for moral support and, with lyrics like "How can you say, 'no child is left behind' / we're not dumb and we're not blind" or "You've come a long way, from whiskey and cocaine", you just know that if she'd made the song a few years earlier, it would have been featured in Michael Moore's Fahrenheit 911. You also get the impression that this is personal for Pink, that she's not doing it to be trendy. On the lyric page for "Dear Mr. President", there's a picture of Pink in an oval frame. Red, white, and blue ribbons are tied to the frame and her father's dog tags share the reddish page."

Rolling Stone's Barry Walters praises Pink for "writ[ing] a scathing letter in 'Dear Mr. President'" and "cooing righteous folk harmonies with Indigo Girls." Sal Cinquemani of Slant Magazine was mixed, writing that "'Dear Mr. President', which cleverly uses George W. Bush's own words against him, pales next to Missundaztood's 'My Vietnam.'"

== Formats and track listings ==
Digital single

1. "Dear Mr. President" – 4:33
2. "Leave Me Alone (I'm Lonely)" – 3:18
3. "Dear Mr. President" (live from Wembley Arena) – 4:45
4. "Leave Me Alone (I'm Lonely)" (live) – 4:44

UK collector's set CD1

1. "Dear Mr. President" – 4:33
2. "Dear Mr. President" (live from Wembley Arena) – 4:45
3. "Leave Me Alone (I'm Lonely)" (live) – 4:44
4. "Dear Mr. President" (video) – 5:00

UK collector's set CD2

1. "Dear Mr. President" – 4:33
2. "Leave Me Alone (I'm Lonely)" – 3:18
3. "Dear Mr. President" (live) – 4:45
4. "Live from Wembley Trailer" (video) – 0:59

Germany collector's set CD1

1. "Dear Mr. President" – 4:33
2. "Dear Mr. President" (live from Wembley Arena) – 4:45
3. "Leave Me Alone (I'm Lonely)" – 3:18
4. "Live from Wembley Trailer" (video) – 0:59

Germany collector's set CD2

1. "Dear Mr. President" – 4:33
2. "Who Knew" (live from Wembley Arena) – 3:29
3. "Dear Mr. President" (live from Wembley Arena) – 4:45

Australian tour collector's set CD1

1. "Dear Mr. President" – 4:33
2. "Who Knew" (live from Wembley Arena) – 3:30
3. "Dear Mr. President" (live From Wembley Arena) – 4:45
4. "On the Road with Pink" (video) – 10:00

Australian tour collector's set CD2

1. "Dear Mr. President" – 4:33
2. "U + Ur Hand" (live from Wembley Arena) – 4:39
3. "Dear Mr. President" (video) – 5:00
4. "Live from Wembley Trailer" (video) – 1:00

Remixes

1. Offer Nissim Club Mix
2. Offer Nissim Radio Edit

== Personnel ==
- Vocals: Pink and Indigo Girls
- Backing vocals: Emily Saliers and Amy Ray
- Mixed by: Al Clay
- Pro Tools: Christopher Rojas
- Guitar: Emily Saliers
- Production coordinator: Lana Israel

== Charts ==
=== Weekly charts ===
Chart (2006–2009)	Peak position
Australia (ARIA)	5
Austria (Ö3 Austria Top 40)	1
Belgium (Ultratop 50 Flanders)	1
Belgium (Ultratip Bubbling Under Wallonia)	3
Canada Hot 100 (Billboard)	55
Czech Republic Airplay (ČNS IFPI)	2
European Hot 100 Singles (Billboard)	10
Germany (GfK)	3
Netherlands (Dutch Top 40)	37
Netherlands (Single Top 100)	43
New Zealand (Recorded Music NZ)	11
Slovakia Airplay (ČNS IFPI)	48
Sweden (Sverigetopplistan)	18
Switzerland (Schweizer Hitparade)	3

=== Year-end charts ===
Chart (2007)	Position
Australia (ARIA)	41
Austria (Ö3 Austria Top 40)	3
Belgium (Ultratop 50 Flanders)	16
European Hot 100 Singles (Billboard)	47
Germany (Media Control GfK)	13
Switzerland (Schweizer Hitparade)	8

=== Decade-end charts ===
Chart (2000–2009)	Position
Austria (Ö3 Austria Top 40)	51

== Certifications ==
Region	Certification	Certified units/sales
Australia (ARIA)	3× Platinum	210,000^{‡}
Austria (IFPI Austria)	Platinum	30,000^{*}
Canada (Music Canada)	Gold	40,000^{‡}
Germany (BVMI)	Platinum	300,000^{^}
United Kingdom (BPI)	Silver	200,000^{‡}
^{*} Sales figures based on certification alone.^{^} Shipments figures based on certification alone.^{‡} Sales+streaming figures based on certification alone.

== Release history ==
Release dates and formats for "Dear Mr. President"
Region	Date	Format(s)	Label(s)	Ref.
United Kingdom	April 2, 2007	Digital download	LaFace	
Germany	April 20, 2007	Digital download (EP)	Sony BMG	
Germany	April 27, 2007	CD	Sony BMG	
Germany	May 18, 2007	Maxi CD	Sony BMG	
Australia	July 7, 2007	CD	Sony BMG	

== See also ==
- List of anti-war songs
- Commander in Chief (song)
