= Who Knew =

2006 single by Pink

Single by Pink

from the album I'm Not Dead
- B-side: "Disconnected"
- Released: May 8, 2006
- Studio: Conway (Hollywood, California)
- Genre: Pop
- Length: 3:28
- Label: LaFace
- Songwriters: Pink; Max Martin; Lukasz Gottwald
- Producers: Max Martin; Dr. Luke

Pink singles chronology
"Stupid Girls" (2006)	"Who Knew" (2006)	"U + Ur Hand" (2006)

Music video
- "Who Knew" on YouTube

"Who Knew" is a song by American singer Pink from her fourth studio album, I'm Not Dead (2006). Written by Pink, Max Martin and Lukasz "Dr. Luke" Gottwald, the song was originally released on May 8, 2006, by the LaFace label to radio as the album's second single, but was only a moderate success. The song saw more success upon its re-release in the United States in June 2007, thanks in large part to the success of "U + Ur Hand". Musically, "Who Knew" is a pop song. Lyrically, it expresses regret at the untimely loss of Pink's good friend.

Upon its release, "Who Knew" was well received by music critics, who commended it as a solid song on the album and lauded the lyrical content. It faced comparisons for having similarities with Kelly Clarkson's 2004 single "Since U Been Gone", also written by Martin and Dr. Luke. The song was commercially successful worldwide, where it peaked in the top five in countries including Australia, the United Kingdom, and component charts in the United States. The song is also Pink's longest chart runner on the Hot 100, spending 36 weeks on the chart. The song was later certified Platinum in the United States by the Recording Industry Association of America (RIAA).

The accompanying music video to the song was directed by Dragon and was released in May 2006, where it shows Pink singing at a county fair, with a storyline about two young lovers who end up being separated after the man begins using drugs. The song has been performed on many of Pink's world tours, including I'm Not Dead Tour, Funhouse Tour and its extension tour Funhouse Summer Carnival Tour.

== Background and composition ==
The NY Daily quotes Pink as writing the song to a male friend (not a boyfriend) she lost to drug abuse. "Who Knew" was written by Pink, Max Martin and Dr. Luke, while it was produced by Martin and Dr. Luke. "Who Knew" was released as the second single off the album worldwide in 2006, while it was re-released to U.S. radio as the album's fourth single in the United States in 2007, after the success of "U + Ur Hand".

'Who Knew'
A 26-second sample of "Who Knew".

Pink has stated that "Who Knew" is her favorite song from her first compilation, Greatest Hits... So Far!!!

"Who Knew" is a pop song. According to Musicnotes.com, which was published by Kobalt Music Publishing America, Inc., the song is written in the key of A major. Pink's vocal's span from E3 to D5. Lyrically, Pink had explained that the song is about "the death of friendship", as well as friends of hers who died as a result of drug overdoses. The song is about several people. The song features acoustic guitar, keyboards, drums, and electric guitars. Gottwald, Martin and Pink co-wrote another song on the album, "U + Ur Hand".

== Reception ==
=== Critical ===
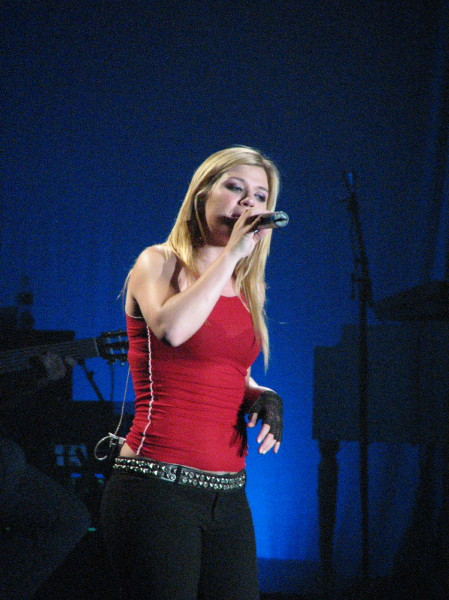
The song was compared by some critics to Kelly Clarkson's hit "Since U Been Gone".

IGN gave a positive report stating "Pink keeps the mainstream, highly accessible pop trappings in full effect with "Who Knew," further making her whole visual stance that much more hilarious (the contrast of a punky, bad girl doing slick pop may be "rebellious" to some, but frankly it just seems contrived). Despite the slickness, the song does reveal Ms. Pink to have a wonderfully full and mesmerizing voice and makes the fact that she's a star understandable." John Murphy from MusicOMH wrote that the song "is perfect driving, anthemic pop." Stylus Magazine said ironically that "It’s “Since U Been Gone” spinning its wheels at half-speed, mutedly wondering where the tune went."

Sal Cinquemani from Slant Magazine wrote that "Songs like 'Who Knew' and 'Long Way to Happy', though good, sound more hair metal than punk", while also noting that it "follows the steps of Clarkson's recent hits." Billboard magazine, in its second review of the song (to accompany the U.S. re-release), called it "another cool, smart, plenty passionate melodic jewel about the death of a friend and/or friendship, with an instantly identifiable, quick-to-the-point, singalong track—maintaining Pink's stance as the smartest female millennium-era singer/songwriter, dazzling in star quality as alterna-pop's premier princess."

=== Commercial ===
The song debuted at number six on the Australian Singles Chart. The song then rose and peaked at number two for two consecutive weeks. In total, the song stayed in the charts for thirty-two weeks, becoming Pink's second longest charting single in that country. The song is also the seventy-fifth "Best of All Time" single in Australia, and is certified platinum for sales of over 70,000 copies. It was ranked at number nine on ARIA's Top 100 singles of 2006. The song had debuted at number thirty-six on the New Zealand Singles Chart, and eventually rose to number eleven, just missing the top ten. The song spent a total of twelve weeks on the charts.

In the European markets, the song was generally successful. "Who Knew" entered the UK Singles Chart at nineteen in early June 2006 and ascended to a peak at five the following week. It is her joint fifth highest charting single in the UK and her second longest charting behind only "So What". With a total of 26 weeks inside the top 100 songs it beats her number-one hit "Just Like a Pill". The song had success throughout other charts in Europe, where it peaked in the top twenty in Switzerland, Austria, France, Belgium, Finland and Norway, while it peaked in the top fifty in the Netherlands and Sweden.

When the single was originally released in North America, "Who Knew" was less successful. Though it peaked at number nineteen on the BDS Airplay Chart in Canada, it was virtually ignored by American radio. In the U.S., where it was released to mainstream radio on May 8, 2006, it failed to chart on the Billboard Hot 100, initially reaching number 18 on the Bubbling Under Hot 100 Singles chart (which comprises the most popular songs yet to enter the Hot 100). Billboard magazine credited the poor performance of the single on radio with significantly reducing momentum of initial sales of I'm Not Dead.

=== Re-release ===
In March 2007, the song was used in promotion for the ABC television show October Road, after which download sales of the song increased; as a result, it debuted at number ninety-five on the Hot 100 at the end of the month. During the same period, "U + Ur Hand", the third single from I'm Not Dead, had achieved major success on pop radio and was credited with "reviving" Pink's career in the US.

Pink performed "Who Knew" on the May 9, 2007, episode of American Idol. It was re-released to mainstream radio in the United States on June 26, 2007, although it had already been receiving minor airplay on CHR/top 40 and hot AC/adult top 40 stations earlier in the month. In week twenty-five of 2007, "Who Knew" re-entered the Billboard Hot 100 at number ninety-four; it eventually climbed to number nine, giving Pink her eighth top ten single on the chart and matching the peak position of "U + Ur Hand". The song is Pink's longest chart runner on the Billboard Hot 100, spending 36 weeks before dropping out (a feat that would later be matched by her 2013 hit, "Just Give Me a Reason" featuring Nate Ruess).

== Music video ==
The single's video was directed by Dragon, a team comprising Samuel Bayer, Robert Hales and Brian Lazzaro. It was filmed in the weekend beginning April 15, 2006, in Los Angeles, United States, and it was released to the internet and to UK music channels in early May 2006. The video reached number one on MTV Germany's top ten and on TRL Italy. "Who Knew" was voted number one on TRL Germany twenty times, allowing Pink to earn the "Golden Tape". In the U.S. Total Request Live broadcast a "First Look" of the video on May 22, and it debuted on the show's top ten countdown the following day; it spent eight non-consecutive days on the countdown (until June 9), peaking at number seven.

It features Pink wearing a light green dress and a young couple visiting a fairground and going on the rides, and at one point the boy puts a necklace on the girl. The video flashes back to the boy secretly injecting himself with drugs on a previous night while the girl is sleeping. At the carnival, when the girl is playing a game, the boy walks away. The girl realizes he's gone and follows him, but when she tries to get him to stay with her he gets violent. He goes to the back of the fairground to inject himself with drugs and breaks into a sweat. His girlfriend wanders around looking for him, and finds him unconscious; he has overdosed. She gives him a kiss, gives back the necklace and phones for an ambulance; after it has arrived, she walks away crying. The final scenes depict flashback sequences showing the couple on several carnival rides together and both Pink and the lovers submerged underwater.

== Track listing and formats ==
- Single CD
1. "Who Knew" (Album Version) - 3:28
2. "Disconnected" - 3:58
- Maxi CD
1. "Who Knew" (Album Version) - 3:28
2. "Who Knew" (Sharp Boys' Love Jonathan Harvey Remix) - 8:42
3. "Who Knew" (The Bimbo Jones Radio Edit) - 3:27
4. "Live In Europe" (Trailer)
- Other Mixes
1. "Who Knew" (Bimbo Jones Club Mix) - 7:49
2. "Who Knew" (Don Diablo & Jason Nevins Edit) - 5:45
3. "Who Knew" (Jason Nevins Radio Edit) - 3:27
4. "Who Knew" (Eddie Baez Club Mix) - 9:45
5. "Who Knew" (Sharp Boys' Coronation Street Dub) - 8:55

== Charts ==
=== Weekly charts ===
Chart (2006–2008)	Peak position
Australia (ARIA)	2
Austria (Ö3 Austria Top 40)	11
Belgium (Ultratop 50 Flanders)	30
Belgium (Ultratip Bubbling Under Wallonia)	12
Canada Hot 100 (Billboard)	46
Canada AC (Billboard)	29
Canada Hot AC (Billboard)	4
CIS Airplay (TopHit)	16
Croatia International Airplay (HRT)	3
Czech Republic Airplay (ČNS IFPI)	1
Europe (Eurochart Hot 100)	10
Finland (Suomen virallinen lista)	16
France (SNEP)	24
Germany (GfK)	12
Germany Airplay (BVMI)	1
Hungary (Rádiós Top 40)	1
Ireland (IRMA)	6
Italy (FIMI)	25
Netherlands (Dutch Top 40)	35
Netherlands (Single Top 100)	47
New Zealand (Recorded Music NZ)	11
Norway (VG-lista)	17
Russia Airplay (TopHit)	14
Scottish Singles Sales (Official Charts)	6
Slovakia Airplay (ČNS IFPI)	3
Sweden (Sverigetopplistan)	42
Switzerland (Schweizer Hitparade)	14
UK Singles (Official Charts)	5
UK Airplay (Music Week)	2
Ukraine Airplay (TopHit)	73
US Billboard Hot 100	9
US Adult Pop Airplay (Billboard)	1
US Adult Contemporary (Billboard)	4
US Pop Airplay (Billboard)	1

=== Year-end charts ===
Chart (2006)	Position
Australia (ARIA)	9
Austria (Ö3 Austria Top 40)	35
CIS Airplay (TopHit)	64
Croatia International Airplay (HRT)	23
Europe (Eurochart Hot 100)	48
Germany (Media Control GfK)	38
Hungary (Rádiós Top 40)	13
Russia Airplay (TopHit)	59
Switzerland (Schweizer Hitparade)	52
UK Singles (OCC)	30
UK Airplay (Music Week)	5

Chart (2007)	Position
Hungary (Rádiós Top 40)	89
US Billboard Hot 100	69
US Adult Contemporary (Billboard)	38
US Adult Top 40 (Billboard)	17

Chart (2008)	Position
US Adult Contemporary (Billboard)	13
US Adult Top 40 (Billboard)	25

== Certifications ==
Region	Certification	Certified units/sales
Australia (ARIA)	5× Platinum	350,000^{‡}
Brazil (Pro-Música Brasil)	Gold	30,000^{‡}
Canada (Music Canada)	Platinum	80,000^{‡}
Denmark (IFPI Danmark)	Gold	45,000^{‡}
Germany (BVMI)	Gold	150,000^{‡}
Mexico (AMPROFON)	Platinum	60,000^{‡}
New Zealand (RMNZ)	2× Platinum	60,000^{‡}
United Kingdom (BPI)	2× Platinum	1,200,000^{‡}
United States (RIAA)	Platinum	1,667,000
^{‡} Sales+streaming figures based on certification alone.

== Release history ==
Release dates and formats for "Who Knew"
Region	Date	Format	Label(s)	Ref(s).
United States	May 8, 2006	Contemporary hit radio	LaFace	
Germany	May 26, 2006	CD single	LaFace; BMG	
United Kingdom	May 29, 2006	CD single	LaFace; BMG	
Australia	June 12, 2006	CD single	LaFace; BMG	
United States	June 26, 2007	Contemporary hit radio	LaFace	
