= U + Ur Hand =

2006 single by Pink

Single by Pink

from the album I'm Not Dead
- B-side: "Crash & Burn"
- Released: August 28, 2006
- Studio: Conway (Los Angeles)
- Genre: Power pop; dance-rock
- Length: 3:33
- Label: LaFace
- Songwriters: Pink; Max Martin; Lukasz Gottwald; Rami Yacoub
- Producers: Max Martin; Dr. Luke

Pink singles chronology
"Who Knew" (2006)	"U + Ur Hand" (2006)	"Nobody Knows" (2006)

Music video
- "U + Ur Hand" on YouTube

"U + Ur Hand" (pronounced "you and your hand") is a song by American pop singer Pink. It is the third single from her fourth studio album I'm Not Dead (2006). It was released on August 28, 2006, and ignited controversy due to its explicit lyrical content. The song was written by Pink, Max Martin, and Dr. Luke, the same trio who wrote Pink's previous hit single "Who Knew"; the song is also co-written by Rami Yacoub. The two songs eventually became Pink's first two singles to receive Platinum certifications from Recording Industry Association of America (RIAA) and the first two among a series of hits by Martin and Dr. Luke that followed, including Pink's first solo number-one hit on the US Billboard Hot 100, "So What".

"U + Ur Hand" was well received by music critics. Commercially, it peaked at number nine on the Billboard Hot 100, becoming Pink's seventh top-ten hit on the chart, and was ranked number 29 on Billboard's year-end chart for 2007. The single performed well internationally, peaking atop the radio charts of the Czech Republic and Hungary and reaching the top 10 in over 10 other countries.

== Writing and controversy ==
Pink wrote the song with Max Martin, Luke Gottwald, and Rami, with a lyrical focus on mocking the men who would flirt with her in clubs. The title refers to the line "looks like it's just me and my hand tonight", which was a phrase she had heard guys using. The song has often been compared to the Veronicas' song "4ever" due to similarities, which are attributed to the fact both songs are written by Martin and Gottwald.

The song caused controversy in the U.S. because of its "racy" references to masturbation, and consequently some radio stations refused to play it. Pink and her publicist further stated that she was prohibited from singing "U + Ur Hand" on the U.S. television show American Idol because of such references. After being asked to change the title and lyrics to "U + Ur Heart", she said, "You want me to rewrite my song for you. For American fucking Idol? What does that even mean, how do you have sex with your heart?" She performed "Who Knew" instead.

== Release and reception ==
Pink reportedly wanted "U + Ur Hand" to be the second single from I'm Not Dead, but "Who Knew" was released as the second and "U + Ur Hand" was instead released as the third. The single had success in Europe, reaching number 10 in the United Kingdom, number four in Germany and number 11 in France; it peaked inside the top ten on the European Hot 100 Singles chart. In Australia the song peaked at number five on the ARIA Singles Chart and is certified platinum for sales of 70,000 copies. It was ranked at number 25 on ARIA's Top 100 Singles of 2006.

It was released to radio in the United States on October 30. In January 2007 "U + Ur Hand" debuted on the Hot 100 at number 94, and it peaked at number nine. It was the most successful single from I'm Not Dead in the U.S., and her highest-charting song since "Just Like a Pill" (2002). "U + Ur Hand" peaked at number 24 on the Canadian Hot 100, in the first edition of the chart provided by Billboard.

Billboard magazine credited the single with causing an increase in the U.S. sales of I'm Not Dead, which returned to the Billboard 200 albums chart in the same period the single entered the Hot 100. The album later re-entered the top 100 on the strength of "U + Ur Hand" and a resurgence of interest in "Who Knew". According to Tom Carraba, Zomba Label Group general manager and executive vice president of sales and marketing, the "patience" of radio stations, the "great" music video for the single and Pink's participation in Justin Timberlake's FutureSex/LoveShow tour was responsible for the increase in popularity of "U + Ur Hand", which consequently led to renewed interest in the album. Carraba said the single "is the vehicle that will reignite the U.S. marketplace. We think we have a number-one record on our hands." One program director at the radio station WBBM-FM attributed the success of the single to its appeal to women, calling it "a female anthem" and "very fitting to people who are sick of getting hit on by guys at the club, and want to give them a nice buzz off ... [i]t's relevant to what's going on with young people".

The song was well received by music critics. Rolling Stone said in their review of I'm Not Dead that Pink "sets a proudly bitchy tone in the song", and AllMusic described Pink as "taunting and teasing" in "U + Ur Hand". British newspaper The Guardian wrote, "the pithy put-downs of ["U + Ur Hand"] make bearable the sudden shift from classy beats to lumpen power pop". Entertainment Weekly told that "including one that's destined to be an instant word-of-mouth smash: the irresistibly rude U + Ur Hand, in which Pink tells a drunken club suitor just whom he'll be having sex with later (the title provides the answer)." NY Times also praised: "Pink stays playfully upbeat when she's irritated. U + Ur Hand uses a Joan Jett stomp to give a singles-bar Lothario a brusque brushoff, warning, I'm not here for your entertainment/ You don't wanna mess with me tonight.

== Music video ==
Pink shot the music videos for "U + Ur Hand" and "Stupid Girls" simultaneously, before the decision was made to release the latter as the first single from I'm Not Dead. Dave Meyers directed both videos. The "U + Ur Hand" video was shot in Sun Valley, California, at the Haziza Gallery in Los Angeles, at La Center Studios and at the Hollywood Roosevelt Hotel in Hollywood, California in December 2005. Pink stated that in the "U + Ur Hand" video she was "glammed" up and that it took four hours of make-up and one hour of shooting for every different look in the video. She said she wanted it to be "a colorful video". The outfit that Pink was wearing in the bedroom scene consisted of pieces of black lace that was imported from France and cost US$300 per yard of the fabric. The actor in the tea garden scene is Tristan Castro.

The music video for "U + Ur Hand" premiered on Canada's MuchMusic network on July 18, 2006, and was released in Europe at the end of August. In the United States it premiered on MTV's Total Request Live on September 29 as the "First Look" for that day. Six days after its debut, the video reached number one on TRL, Pink's second video to do so after the video for her 2003 single "Trouble". It shows Pink as "Lady Delish", in a Garage, training in a Gym, sitting on a balcony, in a 'Tea Garden', at a party and on a bed.

The video features Pink posing as several of New Zealand artist Martin Emond's characters, including "Baby Red Knuckles", "Rocker Bikergirl" and "Hard Candy". In the video, she has six different looks. During the video, Pink is shown reading a book with pictures of each scene that follows. The use of these characters was uncredited and unauthorised. At the time of the video release, Illicit Streetwear and the Martin F. Emond estate were reviewing their options to take action.

== Track listings ==
- UK CD1
1. "U + Ur Hand" – 3:36
2. "Crash & Burn" (feat. Gentleman) – 4:28
- UK CD2
1. "U + Ur Hand" – 3:36
2. "Crash & Burn" (feat. Gentleman) – 4:28
3. "U + Ur Hand" (Beat Culting Club Mix) – 6:42
4. "U + Ur Hand" (Bimbo Jones Remix) – 8:15
5. "U + Ur Hand" (video) – 3:40

== Charts ==
=== Weekly charts ===
Chart (2006–2007)	Peak position
Australia (ARIA)	5
Austria (Ö3 Austria Top 40)	3
Belgium (Ultratop 50 Flanders)	20
Belgium (Ultratip Bubbling Under Wallonia)	13
Canada Hot 100 (Billboard)	24
CIS Airplay (TopHit)	12
CIS Airplay (TopHit); Beat Culting remix	41
CIS Airplay (TopHit); Bimbo Jones vocal remix	78
Croatia International Airplay (HRT)	5
Czech Republic Airplay (ČNS IFPI)	1
Denmark (Tracklisten)	8
Europe (Eurochart Hot 100)	8
Finland (Suomen virallinen lista)	14
France (SNEP)	11
Germany (GfK)	4
Germany Airplay (BVMI)	2
Hungary (Rádiós Top 40)	1
Ireland (IRMA)	13
Italy (FIMI)	20
Lithuania (EHR)	15
Netherlands (Dutch Top 40)	31
Netherlands (Single Top 100)	37
New Zealand (Recorded Music NZ)	10
Poland (Polish Airplay Charts)	2
Romania (Romanian Top 100)	8
Russia Airplay (TopHit)	10
Russia Airplay (TopHit); Beat Culting remix	38
Russia Airplay (TopHit); Bimbo Jones vocal remix	74
Scottish Singles Sales (Official Charts)	6
Slovakia Airplay (ČNS IFPI)	6
Sweden (Sverigetopplistan)	5
Switzerland (Schweizer Hitparade)	5
UK Singles (Official Charts)	10
Ukraine Airplay (TopHit)	125
Ukraine Airplay (TopHit); Beat Culting remix	97
Ukraine Airplay (TopHit); Bimbo Jones vocal remix	119
US Billboard Hot 100	9
US Adult Pop Airplay (Billboard)	5
US Pop Airplay (Billboard)	1
Venezuela Pop Rock (Record Report)	2

=== Year-end charts ===
Chart (2006)	Position
Australia (ARIA)	25
Austria (Ö3 Austria Top 40)	42
Croatia International Airplay (HRT)	46
Europe (Eurochart Hot 100)	41
Germany (Media Control GfK)	46
Sweden (Hitlistan)	25
Switzerland (Schweizer Hitparade)	50
UK Singles (OCC)	70

Chart (2007)	Position
CIS Airplay (TopHit)	75
CIS Airplay (TopHit); Beat Culting remix	92
CIS Airplay (TopHit); Bimbo Jones vocal remix	164
Europe (Eurochart Hot 100)	98
Hungary (Rádiós Top 40)	4
Sweden (Sverigetopplistan)	91
Switzerland (Schweizer Hitparade)	98
Russia Airplay (TopHit)	68
Russia Airplay (TopHit); Beat Culting remix	87
Russia Airplay (TopHit); Bimbo Jones vocal remix	150
US Billboard Hot 100	29
US Adult Top 40 (Billboard)	13

== Certifications ==
Region	Certification	Certified units/sales
Australia (ARIA)	3× Platinum	210,000^{‡}
Austria (IFPI Austria)	Gold	15,000^{*}
Canada (Music Canada)	Platinum	80,000^{‡}
Denmark (IFPI Danmark)	Gold	4,000^{^}
Germany (BVMI)	Gold	150,000^{^}
New Zealand (RMNZ)	Platinum	30,000^{‡}
Sweden (GLF)	Platinum	20,000^{‡}
United Kingdom (BPI)	Platinum	600,000^{‡}
United States (RIAA)	Platinum	1,000,000^{*}
^{*} Sales figures based on certification alone.^{^} Shipments figures based on certification alone.^{‡} Sales+streaming figures based on certification alone.

== Release history ==
Release dates and formats for "U Ur Hand"
Region	Date	Format	Label(s)	Ref(s).
United Kingdom	August 28, 2006	CD single	RCA	
Germany	September 29, 2006	CD single	Sony BMG	
Australia	October 2, 2006	CD single	Sony BMG; LaFace	
United States	October 31, 2006	Contemporary hit radio	LaFace	
United States	November 6, 2006	Hot adult contemporary radio	LaFace	
