= Stupid Girls =

2006 single by Pink

Single by Pink

from the album I'm Not Dead
- B-side: "Heartbreaker"
- Released: February 7, 2006
- Studio: Magic Shop, Turtle Sound (New York City)
- Genre: Dance; hip-hop; pop-reggae
- Length: 3:17
- Label: LaFace
- Songwriters: Alecia Moore; Billy Mann; Niklas Olovson; Robin Mortensen Lynch
- Producers: Billy Mann; MachoPsycho

Pink singles chronology
"Last to Know" (2004)	"Stupid Girls" (2006)	"Who Knew" (2006)

Music video
- "Stupid Girls" on YouTube

Audio sample
- file; help

"Stupid Girls" is a song recorded by American singer Pink from her fourth studio album I'm Not Dead (2006). It was released in February 2006 as the first single from her fourth studio album on LaFace Records. The song marked Pink's return to LaFace Records under Zomba Label Group via Sony BMG, after Arista Records consolidated LaFace's operations into its own in mid-2001. "Stupid Girls" was written by Pink, Billy Mann, Niklas Olovson, and Robin Mortensen Lynch. Mann and MachoPsycho both produced the track. The song introduces a more provocative, feminist, and explicit side of Pink. Lyrically, it condemns sexism and encourages intelligence in women.

A music video was filmed in December 2005 and premiered on MTV's Overdrive on January 26, 2006. It features Pink in a variety of roles, both as an angel and a demon, a variety of celebrities, a random woman getting plastic surgery, a lady with a purging disorder, and others. The song was well received by critics for its sound, its lyrical content, and that it was "sexy". Due to the lyrical content, Zomba Label Group (a division of Sony BMG) was reluctant to release the song as the first single and decided to release the music video first before soliciting the track to radio markets. According to Zomba, over eight million people downloaded the video immediately after it was available online, but also "went online to download the audio from the video in order to get it on radio".

The song reached the top 10 in 15 countries, including the United Kingdom, New Zealand, Australia, Canada, and throughout Europe. In the United States, the song peaked at number 13. The song earned Pink a nomination for Best Female Pop Vocal Performance at the 2007 Grammy Awards.

== Composition ==
Set in the key of E minor, "Stupid Girls" lyrically condemns sexism and promotes intelligence in women and girls.

== Commercial performance ==
The single entered the U.S. Billboard Hot 100 chart in the week of February 25 at number 24, the week's highest debut and the highest debut of Pink's career (later topped by her 2008 single, So What). In the week of March 4, it climbed to number 13, becoming Pink's eighth top-20 single in the United States and her highest peaking single since "Just Like a Pill" (2002). Its number-17 peak on the Top 40 Mainstream chart, however, did not match that of most of her previous singles. "Stupid Girls" remained on the Hot 100 for sixteen weeks, and it reached the top 20 on the Pop 100 and appeared on the Adult Top 40. It received airplay in nightclubs, peaking inside the top 20 on the Hot Dance Club Play chart. "Stupid Girls" was certified Gold by RIAA on February 13, 2008.

The single was a bigger chart hit elsewhere—it reached number two on the Canadian Singles Chart, and on the Australian ARIA Singles Chart, it entered at number four and is certified gold for sales of over 35,000. It was ranked number 39 on ARIA's top 100 singles of 2006 list. It also peaked at number four on the UK Singles Chart, becoming Pink's highest charting single in the UK since "Feel Good Time" (2003). It reached the top 10 in most countries in Europe.

"Stupid Girls" was nominated in the category of Best Female Pop Vocal Performance at the 2007 Grammy Awards.

== Critical reception ==
About.com praised the song and highlighted it: "she has rarely been as pointed in her socio-political views as in the hit "Stupid Girls" (...) "Stupid Girls" is musically a dance/hip-hop gem." AllMusic praised her delivery when she's taunting and teasing this song and it was titled as one of the standouts on the album. Entertainment Weekly noted that this song has some verve. The Guardian was less positive, noting that her vocals are as superficial as the starlets she attacks. LA Times wrote that this song fuses many genres greatly and called it "hilarious feminist romp." Jon Pareles was favorable: "the pop-reggae of 'Stupid Girls' snidely dismisses the bimbos she sees everywhere, though she apparently has studied their habits closely." PopMatters was negative: "On 'Stupid Girls', she rails against the idea that women have to choose between being smart and being sexy, as if the two are mutually exclusive. Sal Cinqemani of Slant Magazine was favorable: "As always, Pink's ragged vocals are better than she's often given credit for and there's still a rebel sensibility, at least lyrically, on the catchy lead single "Stupid Girls" ("Where, oh where, have all the smart people gone?" she begs, lambasting "porno paparazzi girls"—which would have made for a more fun title—the way she took aim at Britney two albums ago)." Rolling Stone praised the collaboration with Lilith Fair and added that she takes on 'stupid girls' with these lyrics "What happened to the dream of a girl president?/She's dancing in the video next to 50 Cent."

Feminist website Feminspire were considerably more critical, naming the song in 2014 as one of "the top ten most sexist songs that aren't rap or hip hop from the last 20 years". Author Noor Al-Sibai remarked that: "Pink shits on these women who are too stupid to break out of the chains of patriarchy by harshly judging their promiscuity and blaming them for 'giving in' to sexist tropes. Because obviously, women are to blame for their sexist objectification."

== Music video ==
Pink parodying Mary-Kate Olsen in the music video for "Stupid Girls"

The single's video was directed by Dave Meyers and premiered on MTV's broadband channel Overdrive on January 26, 2006. Meyers and Pink shot the videos for "Stupid Girls" and "U + Ur Hand", the album's third single, in December 2005, before the decision was made as to which would become the album's lead single. Pink described the video as "sick and twisted and insane" and said of Meyers, "He has an insane imagination. I don't think everyone else is going to laugh, but just know that we all did." Pink did her own stunts for the video. According to Barry Weiss, president of Zomba Music Group, executives at Pink's label were reluctant to release the song as the album's first single until the video "hit a chord" with them. They decided to release the video before issuing the song to radio, and 8.6 million people downloaded the video when it was made available on the internet. Zomba's senior vice president of marketing Janet Kleinbaum said that radio programmers "went online to download the audio from the video in order to get it on radio".

The video shows Pink as an angel and a demon who try to influence the future of a young girl. The angel shows her a series of images demonstrating the stupidity of current trends in female celebrities, and the images feature Pink in various roles, including a dancer in a 50 Cent video, a girl attempting to attract the attention of an instructor at the gym but her tracksuit pants get caught in the treadmill, causing them to be ripped off and exposing her bright pink panties, a girl who uses her emergency inflatable breasts at a bowling alley, a girl at a tanning salon, a girl with purging disorder who considers calories "so not sexy", an old woman in a pink tracksuit who looks as if she is trying too hard to look young, a girl getting plastic surgery, a girl making a sex tape, a girl washing her car and rubbing a facecloth and soap all over herself, and a girl who goes into what looks like a pet shop, buys an "itsy bitsy doggy" with the advertisement that it "stays younger longer", and drives her car so carelessly while putting on makeup that she runs over two people. Pink also plays characters meant to represent the opposite of "stupid girls", such as a female president and a girl winning a game of football. The video ends with the girl choosing a football (fitness), a computer (work), books (knowledge and adequate education), a pair of dance shoes (love), and a keyboard (leisure) over makeup (vanity) and a set of dolls (children) as she wants a normal life and the images are too overwhelming for her; the demon is defeated.

Some of the negatively portrayed characters in the video are parodies of young female celebrities such as Mary-Kate Olsen, who provides the basis for the Boho-chic dressing style of the girl who visits a Fred Segal clothing store. The redheaded girl who hits pedestrians with her car is a parody of Lindsay Lohan. The scene in which Pink washes a car in a bikini is a parody of similar scenes in the video for Jessica Simpson's "These Boots Are Made for Walkin'" (2005) and a 2005 Carl's Jr. television commercial featuring Paris Hilton. The girl dancing in a 50 Cent video portrayed the image of Fergie from The Black Eyed Peas. The digital video shots showing Pink in bed with a man parallel those in the Paris Hilton sex tape 1 Night in Paris. The scene where Pink portrays a blonde coming into a bathroom throwing up food in order to be skinny (portraying anorexia and bulimia) is reported to be portraying Nicole Richie's eating disorders. Towards the end of the video, an older woman with leathery skin appears next to a hot pink Honda S2000, which is exactly the same car driven by Devon Aoki in the film 2 Fast 2 Furious.

The video debuted on the U.S. MTV Total Request Live countdown on January 31 and peaked at number six; it remained on the countdown for fourteen days, until February 23. The video was retired on the Poland version of MTV's Total Request Live, and it won the MTV Video Music Award for Best Pop Video in August 2006 (see 2006 MTV Video Music Awards). When she was receiving the award, Pink parodied Paris Hilton by talking in a higher pitched voice and acting overly excited. Nicole Richie co-presented the award.

In 2023, Paris Hilton wrote in her memoir that she felt judged by being parodied in the music video but called Pink a "brilliant" singer.

== Live performances ==
Pink has performed "Stupid Girls" on her I'm Not Dead Tour and her Funhouse Tour.

== Track listings ==
- UK CD1
1. "Stupid Girls" – 3:16
2. "Heartbreaker" – 3:08
- UK CD2
1. "Stupid Girls – 3:16
2. "Stupid Girls" (D-Bop's 3am at Crash Mix) – 6:51
3. "Stupid Girls" (Junior Vasquez & Dynamix Club Remix) – 8:59
4. "Stupid Girls" (Noize Trip Remix) – 3:13
5. "Stupid Girls" (video) – 3:25
- UK 12-inch
1. "Stupid Girls" (Junior Vasquez & Dynamix Club Remix) – 8:59
2. "Stupid Girls" (Noize Trip Remix) – 3:13
3. "Stupid Girls" (D-Bop's 3am at Crash Mix) – 6:51
4. "Stupid Girls" (Kardinal Beatz Remix) – 3:23
5. "Stupid Girls" (Eddie Baez Big Room Anthem Radio Mix) – 3:18
- Remixes
1. "Stupid Girls" (Hani Stupid Radio Edit) - 3:28
2. "Stupid Girls" (D-Bop's 3am at Crash Radio Edit) – 4:11
3. "Stupid Girls" (Junior Vasquez & Dynamix Radio Edit) – 4:02
4. "Stupid Girls" (Eddie Baez Big Room Anthem Radio Edit) – 3:18
5. "Stupid Girls" (Kardinal Beatz Remix) – 3:35
6. "Stupid Girls" (Noize Trip Remix) – 3:13
7. "Stupid Girls" (Hani Stupid Club Mix) – 8:26
8. "Stupid Girls" (D-Bop's 3am at Crash Club Mix) – 6:51
9. "Stupid Girls" (Junior Vasquez & Dynamix Club Mix) – 9:00
10. "Stupid Girls" (Eddie Baez Big Room Anthem Club Mix) – 7:37
11. "Stupid Girls" (Soul Seekerz Club Mix) – 6:04

== Charts ==
=== Weekly charts ===
Chart (2006)	Peak position
Australia (ARIA)	4
Austria (Ö3 Austria Top 40)	3
Belgium (Ultratop 50 Flanders)	16
Belgium (Ultratop 50 Wallonia)	14
Canada Digital Song Sales (Billboard)	2
Canada CHR/Pop Top 30 (Radio & Records)	7
Canada Hot AC Top 30 (Radio & Records)	1
CIS Airplay (TopHit)	4
CIS Airplay (TopHit) D-Bop's 3 Am at Crash mix	94
Croatia International Airplay (HRT)	1
Denmark (Tracklisten)	6
Europe (Eurochart Hot 100)	2
Finland (Suomen virallinen lista)	1
France (SNEP)	13
Germany (GfK)	5
Germany Airplay (BVMI)	1
Hungary (Rádiós Top 40)	1
Ireland (IRMA)	5
Italy (FIMI)	8
Netherlands (Dutch Top 40)	9
Netherlands (Single Top 100)	9
New Zealand (Recorded Music NZ)	7
Norway (VG-lista)	2
Romania (Romanian Top 100)	3
Russia Airplay (TopHit)	4
Russia Airplay (TopHit) D-Bop's 3 Am at Crash mix	106
Scottish Singles Sales (Official Charts)	2
Spain (Promusicae)	9
Sweden (Sverigetopplistan)	16
Switzerland (Schweizer Hitparade)	2
UK Singles (Official Charts)	4
Ukraine Airplay (TopHit)	5
Ukraine Airplay (TopHit) D-Bop's 3 Am at Crash mix	10
US Billboard Hot 100	13
US Adult Pop Airplay (Billboard)	25
US Dance Club Songs (Billboard)	19
US Pop Airplay (Billboard)	17

=== Year-end charts ===
Chart (2006)	Position
Australia (ARIA)	39
Austria (Ö3 Austria Top 40)	39
Belgium (Ultratop 50 Flanders)	72
Belgium (Ultratop 50 Wallonia)	60
Brazil (Crowley)	44
CIS Airplay (TopHit)	21
Croatia International Airplay (HRT)	18
Europe (Eurochart Hot 100)	51
Germany (Media Control GfK)	47
Hungary (Rádiós Top 40)	14
Italy (FIMI)	43
Netherlands (Dutch Top 40)	64
Netherlands (Single Top 100)	78
Romania (Romanian Top 100)	20
Russia Airplay (TopHit)	22
Sweden (Hitlistan)	84
Switzerland (Schweizer Hitparade)	15
UK Singles (OCC)	87
Ukraine Airplay (TopHit)	30
Ukraine Airplay (TopHit) D-Bop's 3 Am at Crash mix	148
US Billboard Hot 100	96

== Certifications ==
Region	Certification	Certified units/sales
Australia (ARIA)	2× Platinum	140,000^{‡}
Canada (Music Canada)	Gold	10,000^{*}
Japan (RIAJ) Digital single	Gold	100,000^{*}
United Kingdom (BPI)	Silver	200,000^{‡}
United States (RIAA)	Gold	500,000^{*}
^{*} Sales figures based on certification alone.^{‡} Sales+streaming figures based on certification alone.

== Release history ==
Release dates and formats for "Stupid Girls"
Region	Date	Format	Label(s)	Ref(s).
United States	February 7, 2006	Contemporary hit radio	LaFace	
Germany	March 10, 2006	CD	LaFace	
Australia	March 13, 2006	CD	Sony BMG; LaFace	
United Kingdom	March 20, 2006	CD	LaFace	
