= List of songs written by Pink =

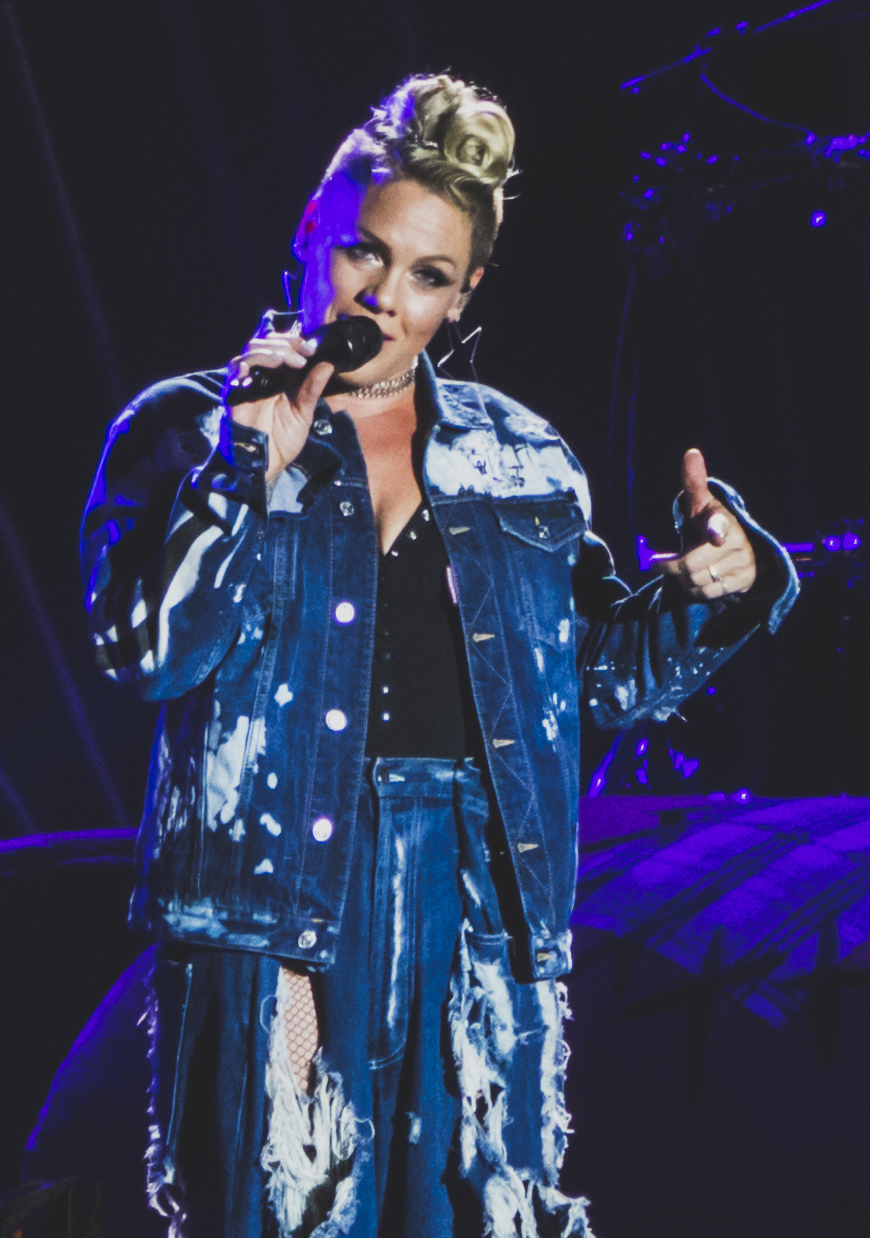
Pink performing in 2017

American singer Pink has written songs for all nine of her studio albums albums, greatest hits album, her collaborative album with Dallas Green, and for other artists.

At age 15, Pink formed the R&B group Choice with two other teenage girls, and signed with LaFace Records. In 1998, Choice disbanded after LaFace co-founder L.A. Reid gave Pink an ultimatum: "go solo or go home." She released her first solo studio album Can't Take Me Home in April 2000.

== Songs ==
List of songs written or co-written by Pink
Song	Artist(s)	Writer(s)	Album	Year	Ref.
"18 Wheeler"	Pink	Pink; Dallas Austin	Missundaztood	2001	
"90 Days"	Pink; Wrabel	Pink; Stephen Wrabel; Steve Robson	Hurts 2B Human	2019	
"All I Know So Far" †	Pink	Pink; Benji Pasek; Justin Paul	All I Know So Far: Setlist	2021	
"All Out of Fight"	Pink	Pink; Johnny McDaid; Fred Gibson	Trustfall	2023	
"Are We All We Are" †	Pink	Pink; John Hill; Butch Walker; Emile Haynie	The Truth About Love	2012	
"Ave Mary A" #	Pink	Pink; Billy Mann; Pete Wallace	Funhouse	2008	
"Bad Influence" †	Pink	Pink; Billy Mann; Butch Walker	Funhouse	2008	
"Barbies"	Pink	Pink; Julia Michaels; Ross Golan; Jakob Jerlström; Ludvig Söderberg	Beautiful Trauma	2017	
"Beam Me Up"	Pink	Pink; Billy Mann	The Truth About Love	2012	
"Better Life"	Pink	Pink; Jack Antonoff; Sam Dew	Beautiful Trauma	2017	
"Beautiful Trauma" †	Pink	Pink; Jack Antonoff	Beautiful Trauma	2017	
"Blow Me (One Last Kiss)" †	Pink	Pink; Greg Kurstin	The Truth About Love	2012	
"Break the Cycle"	You+Me	Pink; Dallas Green	Rose Ave.	2014	
"Bridge of Light" †	Pink	Pink; Billy Mann	Happy Feet Two (Original Motion Picture Soundtrack)	2011	
"Boring"	Pink	Pink; Max Martin; Shellback	Funhouse	2008	
"Broken & Beautiful" †	Kelly Clarkson	Pink; Johnny McDaid; Christopher Comstock; Steve Mac	UglyDolls: Original Motion Picture Soundtrack	2019	
"But We Lost"	Pink	Pink; Greg Kurstin	Beautiful Trauma	2017	
"Can We Pretend" †	Pink; Cash Cash	Pink; Jean Paul Makhlouf; Alex Makhlouf; Samuel Frisch; Ryan Tedder	Hurts 2B Human	2019	
"Can't Take Me Home"	Pink	Pink; Harold Frasier; Steve "Rhythm" Clarke	Can't Take Me Home	2000	
"Capsized"	You+Me	Pink; Dallas Green	Rose Ave.	2014	
"Catch-22"	Pink	Pink; Linda Perry	Missundaztood	2001	
"Catch Me While I'm Sleeping"	Pink	Pink; Linda Perry	Try This	2003	
"Centerfold"	Pink	Pink; Cathy Dennis; Greg Kurstin	I'm Not Dead	2006	
"Chaos & Piss"	Pink	Pink; Francis White	The Truth About Love	2012	
"Circle Game"	Pink	Pink; Greg Kurstin	Hurts 2B Human	2019	
"Conversions with My 13 Year Old Self"	Pink	Pink; Billy Mann	I'm Not Dead	2006	
"Could've Had Everything"	Pink	Pink; Francis White	Funhouse	2008	
"Courage"	Pink	Pink; Greg Kurstin; Sia Furler	Hurts 2B Human	2019	
"Courage to Change" †	Sia	Pink; Sia Furler; Greg Kurstin	Music – Songs from and Inspired by the Motion Picture	2020	
"Crash & Burn"	Pink	Pink; Billy Mann	I'm Not Dead	2006	
"Crystal Ball"	Pink	Pink; Billy Mann	Funhouse	2008	
"'Cuz I Can" #	Pink	Pink; Max Martin; Lukasz Gottwald	I'm Not Dead	2006	
"Dear Diary"	Pink	Pink; Linda Perry	Missundaztood	2001	
"Dear Mr. President" †	Pink; Indigo Girls	Pink; Billy Mann	I'm Not Dead	2006	
"Delirium"	Pink	Pink; Linda Perry	Try This	2003	
"Disconnected"	Pink	Pink; Butch Walker	I'm Not Dead	2006	
"Don't Let Me Get Me" †	Pink	Pink; Dallas Austin	Missundaztood	2001	
"Eventually"	Pink	Pink; Linda Perry	Missundaztood	2001	
"Family Portrait" †	Pink	Pink; Scott Storch	Missundaztood	2001	
"Fingers"	Pink	Pink; Billy Mann	I'm Not Dead	2006	
"For Now"	Pink	Pink; Julia Michaels; Mattias Larsson; Robin Fedriksson; Max Martin	Beautiful Trauma	2017	
"Free"	Pink	Pink; Linda Perry; Eric Schermerhorn; Paul III; Brian MacLeod	Try This	2003	
"From a Closet in Norway (Oslo Blues)"	You+Me	Pink; Dallas Green	Rose Ave.	2014	
"Fuckin' Perfect" †	Pink	Pink; Max Martin; Shellback	Greatest Hits... So Far!!!	2010	
"Funhouse" †	Pink	Pink; Tony Kanal; Jimmy Harry	Funhouse	2008	
"Gently"	You+Me	Pink; Dallas Green	Rose Ave.	2014	
"Glitter in the Air" †	Pink	Pink; Billy Mann	Funhouse	2008	
"God Is a DJ" †	Pink	Pink; Billy Mann; Jonathan S. Davis	Try This	2003	
"Gone to California"	Pink	Pink; Linda Perry	Missundaztood	2001	
"Good Old Days"	Pink	Pink; Butch Walker; David Schuler	The Truth About Love	2012	
"Happy"	Pink	Pink; Teddy Gieger; Alexandra Yatchenko; Steph Jones	Hurts 2B Human	2019	
"Hate Me"	Pink	Pink; Greg Kurstin	Trustfall	2023	
"Heartbreak Down"	Pink	Pink; Billy Mann	Greatest Hits... So Far!!!	2010	
"Heartbreaker"	Pink	Pink; Kara DioGuardi; Greg Kurstin	I'm Not Dead	2006	
"Hell wit Ya"	Pink	Pink; Kevin "She'kspere" Briggs; Kandi Burruss; Darius Green	Can't Take Me Home	2000	
"Here Comes the Weekend"	Pink; Eminem	Pink; Marshall Mathers; Khalil Abdul Rahman; Pranam Injeti; Erik Alcock; Liz Rodrigues	The Truth About Love	2012	
"(Hey Why) Miss You Sometime"	Pink	Pink; Max Martin; Shellback	Hurts 2B Human	2019	
"Hiccup"	Pink	Pink; Rozonda "Chilli" Thomas; Tionne Watkins; Harold Frasier; Delouie Avant; Steve "Rhythm" Clarke	Can't Take Me Home	2000	
"Hooker"	Pink	Pink; Tim Armstrong	Try This	2003	
"How Come You're Not Here"	Pink	Pink; Greg Kurstin	The Truth About Love	2012	
"Humble Neighborhoods"	Pink	Pink; Tim Armstrong	Try This	2003	
"Hurts 2B Human" †	Pink; Khalid	Pink; Khaild Robinson; Teddy Geiger; Scott Harris; Anna-Catherine Hartley; Alexander Izquierdo	Hurts 2B Human	2019	
"Hustle" #	Pink	Pink; Dan Reynolds; Jorgen Odegard	Hurts 2B Human	2019	
"I Am Here"	Pink	Pink; Billy Mann; Christian Medice	Beautiful Trauma	2017	
"I Don't Believe You" †	Pink	Pink; Max Martin	Funhouse	2008	
"I Got Money Now"	Pink	Pink; Mike Elizondo	I'm Not Dead	2006	
"I Have See the Rain"	Pink; James T. Moore	Pink; James T. Moore	I'm Not Dead	2006	
"I Walk Alone" †	Cher	Pink; Billy Mann; Niklas Olvoson; Robin Lynch	Closer to the Truth	2013	
"If You're Gonna Fly Away"	Faith Hill	Pink; Linda Perry	Cry	2002	
"I'm Not Dead"	Pink	Pink; Billy Mann	I'm Not Dead	2006	
"Irrelevant" †	Pink	Pink; Ian Fitchuk	Trustfall	2022	
"Is It Love"	Pink	Pink; Harold Frasier; Delouie Avant; Steve "Rhythm" Clarke; Aaron Phillips	Can't Take Me Home	2000	
"Is This Thing On?"	Pink	Pink; Butch Walker; Jake Sinclair	The Truth About Love	2012	
"It's All Your Fault"	Pink	Pink; Max Martin; Shellback	Funhouse	2008	
"Just Give Me a Reason" †	Pink; Nate Ruess	Pink; Nate Ruess; Jeff Bhasker	The Truth About Love	2012	
"Just Like a Pill" †	Pink	Pink; Dallas Austin	Missundaztood	2001	
"Just Like Fire" †	Pink	Pink; Max Martin; Shellback; Oscar Holter	Alice Through the Looking Glass: Original Motion Picture Soundtrack	2016	
"Just Say I'm Sorry"	Pink; Chris Stapleton	Pink; Chris Stapleton	Trustfall	2023	
"Last Call"	Pink	Pink; Billy Mann; Pete Wallace	Trustfall	2023	
"Last to Know" †	Pink	Pink; Tim Armstrong	Try This	2003	
"Leave Me Alone (I'm Lonely)" †	Pink	Pink; Butch Walker	I'm Not Dead	2006	
"Lie to Me"	Cher	Pink; Billy Mann	Closer to the Truth	2013	
"Long Way to Go"	Pink; The Lumineers	Pink; Jeremiah Fraites; Wesley Schultz; Jesse Shatkin; John Sudduth; Maureen McDonald	Trustfall	2023	
"Long Way to Happy"	Pink	Pink; Butch Walker	I'm Not Dead	2006	
"Love Gone Wrong"	You+Me	Pink; Dallas Green	Rose Ave.	2014	
"Love Me Anyway" †	Pink; Chris Stapleton	Pink; Allen Shamblin; Tom Douglas	Hurts 2B Human	2019	
"Love Song"	Pink	Pink; Damon Elliott	Try This	2003	
"Mean"	Pink	Pink; Butch Walker	Funhouse	2008	
"Missundaztood"	Pink	Pink; Linda Perry	Missundaztood	2001	
"More"	Pink	Pink; Jetta John-Hartley; Michael Busbee	Hurts 2B Human	2019	
"My Signature Move"	Pink	Pink; Butch Walker; Jake Sinclair	The Truth About Love	2012	
"My Vietnam"	Pink	Pink; Linda Perry	Missundaztood	2001	
"Never Gonna Not Dance Again" †	Pink	Pink; Max Martin; Shellback	Trustfall	2023	
"Nobody Knows" †	Pink	Pink; Billy Mann	I'm Not Dead	2006	
"Numb"	Pink	Pink; Dallas Austin	Missundaztood	2001	
"Oh My God"	Pink; Peaches	Pink; Tim Armstrong; Merrill Nisker	Try This	2003	
"One Foot Wrong"	Pink	Pink; Eg White	Funhouse	2008	
"Open Door"	You+Me	Pink; Dallas Green	Rose Ave.	2014	
"Outside of You"	Hilary Duff	Pink; Chantal Kreviazuk; Raine Maida	Dignity	2007	
"Please Don't Leave Me" †	Pink	Pink; Max Martin	Funhouse	2008	
"Push You Away"	Pink	Pink; Butch Walker	Funhouse	2008	
"Raise Your Glass" †	Pink	Pink; Max Martin; Shellback	Greatest Hits... So Far!!!	2010	
"Respect"	Pink; Scratch	Pink; Linda Perry	Missundaztood	2001	
"Recovering" †	Celine Dion	Pink; Allen Shamblin; Tom Douglas	—N/a	2016	
"Respect"	Pink; Scratch	Pink; Linda Perry	Missundaztood	2001	
"Revenge" †	Pink; Emineim	Pink; Marshall Mathers; Max Martin; Shellback	Beautiful Trauma	2017	
"Run"	Pink	Pink; Butch Walker; Jake Sinclair	The Truth About Love	2012	
"Runaway"	Pink	Pink; Billy Mann	I'm Not Dead	2006	
"Save My Life"	Pink	Pink; Tim Armstrong	Try This	2003	
"Second Guess"	You+Me	Pink; Dallas Green	Rose Ave.	2014	
"Secrets" †	Pink	Pink; Max Martin; Shellback; Oscar Holter	Beautiful Trauma	2017	
"Slut Like You"	Pink	Pink; Max Martin; Shellback	The Truth About Love	2012	
"So What" †	Pink	Pink; Max Martin; Shellback	Funhouse	2008	
"Sober" †	Pink	Pink; Kara DioGuardi; Nathaniel Hills; Marcella Araica	Funhouse	2008	
"Split Personality"	Pink	Pink; Terence "Tramp-Baby" Abney; Kenneth "Babyface" Evans	Can't Take Me Home	2000	
"Stop Falling"	Pink	Pink; Will Baker; Pete Woodruff	Can't Take Me Home	2000	
"Stupid Girls" †	Pink	Pink; Billy Mann; Nikey Olovson; Robin Lynch	I'm Not Dead	2006	
"Take a Picture"	Mýa	Pink; D. Elliot	Moodring	2003	
"Timebomb"	Pink	Pink; Greg Kurstin	The Truth About Love	2012	
"Thank God I Do" † (Note: Pink receives writing credits for the interpolation of "Just Give Me a Reason")	Lauren Daigle	Pink; Lauren Daigle; Jason Ingram; Jeff Bhasker; Nate Ruess	Lauren Daigle	2023	
"The Great Escape"	Pink	Pink; Dan Wilson	The Truth About Love	2012	
"The King Is Dead but the Queen Is Alive"	Pink	Pink; Butch Walker; Billy Mann; Niklas Olvoson; Robin Lynch	The Truth About Love	2012	
"The Last Song of Your Life"	Pink	Pink; Billy Mann	Hurts 2B Human	2019	
"The One That Got Away"	Pink	Pink; Billy Mann	I'm Not Dead	2006	
"The Truth About Love"	Pink	Pink; Billy Mann; David Schuler	The Truth About Love	2012	
"There You Go" †	Pink	Pink; Kevin "She'kspere" Briggs; Kandi Burruss	Can't Take Me Home	2000	
"This Is How It Goes Down"	Pink; Travis McCoy	Pink; Butch Walker	Funhouse	2008	
"Today's the Day" †	Pink	Pink; Greg Kurstin	—N/a	2015	
"Tonight's the Night"	Pink	Pink; Tim Armstrong	Try This	2003	
"Trouble" †	Pink	Pink; Tim Armstrong	Try This	2003	
"True Love" †	Pink; Lily Allen	Pink; Lily Allen; Greg Kurstin	The Truth About Love	2012	
"Trustfall" †	Pink	Pink; Johnny McDaid; Fred Gibson	Trustfall	2023	
"Try to Hard"	Pink	Pink; Linda Perry	Try This	2003	
"U + Ur Hand" †	Pink	Pink; Max Martin; Lukasz Gottwald; Rami Yacoub	I'm Not Dead	2006	
"Unbeliever"	You+Me	Pink; Dallas Green	Rose Ave.	2014	
"Unwind"	Pink	Pink; Tim Armstrong	Try This	2003	
"Waiting for Love"	Pink	Pink; Linda Perry; Eric Schermerhorn; Paul III; Brian MacLeod	Try This	2003	
"Walk Away"	Pink	Pink; Tim Armstrong	Try This	2003	
"Walk Me Home" †	Pink	Pink; Scott Harris; Nate Ruess	Hurts 2B Human	2019	
"Walk of Shame" †	Pink	Pink; Greg Kurstin	The Truth About Love	2012	
"We Could Have It All"	Pink	Pink; Greg Kurstin; Beck Hansen	Hurts 2B Human	2019	
"What About Us" †	Pink	Pink; Johnny McDaid; Steve Mac	Beautiful Trauma	2017	
"Whatever You Want" †	Pink	Pink; Max Martin; Shellback	Beautiful Trauma	2017	
"Whataya Want from Me" †	Adam Lambert	Pink; Max Martin; Shellback	For Your Entertainment	2009	
"When We're Through"	Pink	Pink; Butch Walker	Funhouse	2008	
"Where Did the Beat Go?"	Pink	Pink; Billy Mann; Jon Keep; Steve Daly	The Truth About Love	2012	
"Where We Go"	Pink	Pink; Greg Kustin	Beautiful Trauma	2017	
"Who Knew" †	Pink	Pink; Max Martin; Lukasz Gottwald	I'm Not Dead	2006	
"Why Did I Ever Like You"	Pink	Pink; Greg Kurstin	Funhouse	2008	
"Wild Hearts Can't Be Broken"	Pink	Pink; Michael Busbee	Beautiful Trauma	2017	
"Words"	Pink	Pink; Billy Man	I'm Not Dead	2006	
"You and Me"	You+Me	Pink; Dallas Green	Rose Ave.	2014	
"You Get My Love"	Pink	Pink; Tobias Jesso Jr.	Beautiful Trauma	2017	
