= Try This Tour =

2004 concert tour by P!nk

- Tour by P!nk
- Associated album: Try This
- Start date: February 19, 2004
- End date: August 22, 2004
- Legs: 3
- No. of shows: 68

P!nk concert chronology
- Party Tour (2002); Try This Tour (2004); I'm Not Dead Tour (2006–2007)

The Try This Tour was the second concert tour by American recording artist P!nk. The tour was launched in support of her third studio album Try This (2003) and visited Europe and Australia.

== About the show ==
The show itself was split into four acts, each representing her three albums and an acoustic act. For the first act, to support her album Can't Take Me Home, Pink sported a massive pink Mohican, a throwback to her pink-haired R&B Can't Take Me Home days. For the second act, to support Missundaztood, she wore a long blond wig and a red leather jacket. For the acoustic act, she wore a long blue, red and white dress. For the fourth act, to support Try This, she lost the wigs and performed in a rock chick style get up. Finally, for the encore, she came dressed up in an outfit fitting for a cover of the Guns N' Roses song "Welcome to the Jungle". For the finale, she performs "Get The Party Started" up in the air.

== Setlist ==
Main set
1. "Can't Take Me Home"
2. "There You Go"
3. "Split Personality"
4. "Most Girls"
5. "Lady Marmalade" (contains excerpts from Christina Aguilera's "Beautiful")
6. "I Wanna Rock"
7. "Don't Let Me Get Me"
8. "18 Wheeler"
9. "Family Portrait"
10. "Just like a Pill"
11. "Respect"
12. Medley: "My Vietnam" / "Misery" / "Eventually"
13. Medley: "Summertime" / "Me and Bobby McGee" / "Piece of My Heart"
14. "Feel Good Time"
15. "God Is a DJ"
16. "Oh My God"
17. "Trouble"
18. "Last to Know"
19. "Try Too Hard"
20. "Unwind"

Encore

21. "Welcome to the Jungle"
22. "Get the Party Started"
Summer 2004
1. "Don't Let Me Get Me"
2. "Trouble"
3. "What's Up"
4. "Respect"
5. "Save My Life"
6. "Last to Know"
7. "Eventually"
8. Medley: "Summertime" / "Me and Bobby McGee" / "Piece of My Heart"
9. "There You Go"
10. "Just like a Pill"
11. "Try Too Hard"
12. "Unwind"
13. "Family Portrait"
14. "18 Wheeler"
15. "Misery"
16. "Numb"
17. "Get the Party Started"

== Tour dates ==
Date	City	Country	Venue	Attendance	Revenue
Europe
February 19, 2004	Dublin	Ireland	Point Theatre	8,106 / 8,106	$360,960
February 20, 2004	Belfast	Northern Ireland	Odyssey Arena	9,604 / 9,604	$408,029
February 23, 2004	Brussels	Belgium	Forest National	—	—
February 25, 2004	Hanover	Germany	Preussag Arena	7,289 / 10,927	$291,626
February 27, 2004	Stuttgart	Germany	Hanns-Martin-Schleyer-Halle	11,611 / 11,611	$468,980
February 28, 2004	Zürich	Switzerland	Hallenstadion	—	—
February 29, 2004	Zürich	Switzerland	Hallenstadion	—	—
March 2, 2004	Frankfurt	Germany	Festhalle Frankfurt	11,766 / 11,766	$474,685
March 4, 2004	Munich	Germany	Olympiahalle	9,970 / 9,970	$428,007
March 5, 2004	Leipzig	Germany	Arena Leipzig	6,571 / 7,316	$246,620
March 7, 2004	Berlin	Germany	Max-Schmeling-Halle	9,047 / 9,201	$377,546
March 8, 2004	Copenhagen	Denmark	Forum Copenhagen	—	—
March 10, 2004	Oslo	Norway	Oslo Spektrum	—	—
March 11, 2004	Stockholm	Sweden	Hovet	11,068 / 11,068	$462,156
March 13, 2004	Hamburg	Germany	Color Line Arena	—	—
March 15, 2004	Cologne	Germany	Kölnarena	12,363 / 12,363	$549,230
March 17, 2004	Paris	France	Palais Omnisports de Paris-Bercy	—	—
March 18, 2004	Rotterdam	Netherlands	Sportpaleis van Ahoy	10,258 / 10,481	$348,099
March 20, 2004	Birmingham	England	NEC Arena	—	—
March 21, 2004	Nottingham	England	Nottingham Arena	—	—
March 23, 2004	London	England	Wembley Arena	—	—
March 24, 2004	London	England	Wembley Arena	—	—
March 26, 2004	Manchester	England	Manchester Evening News Arena	14,264 / 14,964	$591,653
March 27, 2004	Sheffield	England	Hallam FM Arena	—	—
March 28, 2004	Manchester	England	The Ritz	—	—
March 30, 2004	Newcastle	England	Telewest Arena	—	—
March 31, 2004	Glasgow	Scotland	Scottish Exhibition Centre, Hall 4	—	—
April 1, 2004	Glasgow	Scotland	Scottish Exhibition Centre, Hall 4	—	—
April 4, 2004	Vienna	Austria	Wiener Stadthalle	—	—
April 5, 2004	Budapest	Hungary	Budapest Sports Arena	—	—
April 8, 2004	Munich	Germany	Olympiahalle	9,339 / 9,970	$405,699
April 10, 2004	Oberhausen	Germany	König Pilsener Arena	8,833 / 10,219	$369,678
Oceania
April 24, 2004	Newcastle	Australia	Newcastle Entertainment Centre	—	—
April 25, 2004	Sydney	Australia	Sydney Entertainment Centre	—	—
April 28, 2004	Brisbane	Australia	Brisbane Entertainment Centre	—	—
April 30, 2004	Perth	Australia	Challenge Stadium	—	—
May 3, 2004	Adelaide	Australia	Adelaide Entertainment Centre	—	—
May 5, 2004	Melbourne	Australia	Rod Laver Arena	—	—
Europe
June 26, 2004^{[a]}	Frauenfeld	Switzerland	Grosse Allmend	—	—
June 27, 2004^{[b]}	Niederkorn	Luxembourg	Stade Jos Haupert	—	—
June 29, 2004	Amsterdam	Netherlands	Heineken Music Hall	4,280 / 5,500	$175,653
July 1, 2004^{[c]}	Werchter	Belgium	Werchter Festival Grounds	—	—
July 2, 2004^{[d]}	Gdynia	Poland	Kościuszki Square	—	—
July 6, 2004	Moscow	Russia	Olimpiysky	—	—
July 7, 2004	Saint Petersburg	Russia	Ice Palace	—	—
July 9, 2004^{[e]}	Sundsvall	Sweden	Storgatan	—	—
July 10, 2004^{[f]}	Kinross	Scotland	Balado	—	—
July 11, 2004^{[g]}	Naas	Ireland	Punchestown Racecourse	—	—
July 14, 2004	Balingen	Germany	Messegelände Balingen	—	—
July 16, 2004	Bratislava	Slovakia	Samsung Arena	—	—
July 17, 2004	Graz	Austria	Schwarzl Freizeit Zentrum	—	—
July 20, 2004	Belgrade	Serbia and Montenegro	Belgrade Fair – Hall 1	—	—
July 22, 2004^{[h]}	Brașov	Romania	Piața Sfatului	—	—
July 24, 2004	Kilyos	Turkey	Solar Beach	—	—
July 26, 2004^{[i]}	Lucca	Italy	Auditorium di San Romano	—	—
July 28, 2004	Vienne	France	Théâtre Antique de Vienne	—	—
July 29, 2004	Antibes	France	La Pinède	—	—
July 31, 2004	Berlin	Germany	Velodrom	—	—
August 1, 2004	Prague	Czech Republic	Sazka Arena	—	—
August 4, 2004	Hamburg	Germany	Freilichtbühne im Stadtpark	—	—
August 5, 2004^{[j]}	Skanderborg	Denmark	Skanderborg Lake	—	—
August 10, 2004	Reykjavík	Iceland	Laugardalshöll	—	—
August 13, 2004	Colmar	France	Theatre du Parc Expo De Colmar	—	—
August 14, 2004^{[k]}	St. Vith	Belgium	Rock eau Rouge	—	—
August 15, 2004	Kiel	Germany	Ostseehalle	—	—
August 17, 2004^{[l]}	Bonn	Germany	Museumsplatz	—	—
August 19, 2004^{[m]}	Gampel	Switzerland	Festivalgelände am Rotten	—	—
August 21, 2004^{[n]}	Chelmsford	England	Hylands Park	—	—
August 22, 2004^{[n]}	Weston-under-Lizard	England	Weston Park	—	—
Total				144,369 /153,066 (94%)	$6,955,973

Notes:

a This concert was a part of "Frauenfeld Open Air Festival".
b This concert was a part of "Letz Rock Festival".
c This concert was a part of "Rock Werchter Festival".
d This concert was a part of "Open'er Festival".
e This concert was a part of "Gatufest".
f This concert was a part of "T in the Park".
g This concert was a part of "Oxegen".

h This concert was a part of "Golden Stag Festival".
i This concert was a part of "Lucca Festival".
j This concert was a part of "Skanderborg Festival".
k This concert was a part of "Alive Festival".
l This concert was a part of "Bonn Summer Open Air Festival".
m This concert was a part of "Open Air Gampel".
n These concerts were a part of "V Festival".

Cancellations:
July 31, 2004 - Pavilhão Atlântico, Lisbon, Portugal

== Broadcast and recordings ==
A recording of the Try This Tour from Manchester, England was released on DVD titled Pink: Live in Europe outside Europe in early 2006. It was not released in some European regions until November 2006. The DVD contains the full show (with the exception of Christina Aguilera's "Beautiful" during "Lady Marmalade", which is censored) and features a bonus film, On the Road with Pink.
