= Pink: Live in Europe =

Video by Pink
- Released: May 22, 2006
- Recorded: March 26, 2004
- Venues: Manchester Evening News Arena (Manchester, UK)
- Genres: Pop; pop rock; R&B
- Length: 2 hours
- Label: LaFace

Pink chronology
Pink: Live in Europe (2006)	Live from Wembley Arena, London, England (2007)

Pink: Live in Europe (subtitled From the 2004 Try This Tour) is the first live music DVD from Pink, released in 2006. It was shot in Manchester, England at Manchester Arena on March 26th of 2004 during the European leg of the 2004 Try This Tour. The setlist more or less was in chronological order (with a few obvious exceptions, including "Get the Party Started"). Most of the singles at the time were represented, and several album-only cuts were prominently featured.

== Overview ==
During the performance of "Lady Marmalade", Pink imitated Christina Aguilera and sang lines from Aguilera's song "Beautiful". For the DVD release, this segment was branded with a "CENSORED" mark and the audio was modulated so the viewer could not decipher the lyrics. The song also has many sexual references and gave the DVD a 15 age rating in Ireland, as well as MA15+ in Australia for "strong sexual references".

A number of covers are featured on DVD including an entire segment dedicated to Janis Joplin, wherein Pink sang select pieces of three songs.

The concert became the sixth highest-selling DVD for 2007 in Australia.

== Track listing ==
1. "Can't Take Me Home"
2. "There You Go"
3. "Split Personality"
4. "Most Girls"
5. "Lady Marmalade"
6. "I Wanna Rock"
7. "Don't Let Me Get Me"
8. "18 Wheeler"
9. "Family Portrait"
10. "Just like a Pill"
11. "Respect"
12. "My Vietnam"
13. "Misery"
14. "Eventually"
15. "Summertime"/"Me and Bobby McGee"/"Piece of My Heart"
16. "Feel Good Time"
17. "God Is a DJ"
18. "Oh My God"
19. "Trouble"
20. "Last to Know"
21. "Try Too Hard"
22. "Unwind"
23. "Welcome to the Jungle"
24. "Get the Party Started"

== Musicians ==
- Jason Chapman - keyboards, backing vocals
- WM Mylious Johnson - drums
- Adriana Balic - keyboards, backing vocals
- Rafael Moreira - guitar
- Leah Rose Randi - bass guitar, backing vocals
- Brandee Adams - backing vocals

== Charts ==
Chart (2006)	Peak position
Austrian Music DVDs Chart	2
Belgian (Flanders) Music DVDs Chart	6
Belgian (Wallonia) Music DVDs Chart	6
German Albums Chart	32
Netherlands Music DVDs Chart	4
UK Music DVDs Chart	7

Chart (2007)	Peak position
Australian Music DVDs Chart	1

== Certifications ==
Region	Certification	Certified units/sales
Australia (ARIA)	11× Platinum	165,000^{^}
Austria (IFPI Austria)	Gold	5,000^{*}
Germany (BVMI)	3× Gold	75,000^{^}
United Kingdom (BPI)	Platinum	50,000^{*}
United States (RIAA)	Gold	50,000^{^}
^{*} Sales figures based on certification alone.^{^} Shipments figures based on certification alone.
