= God Is a DJ =

God Is a DJ may refer to:

- "God Is a DJ" (Faithless song), 1998
- "God Is a DJ" (Pink song), 2004
