= Hustle (Pink song) =

Promotional single by Pink

from the album Hurts 2B Human
- Released: March 28, 2019
- Studio: The Village Studios
- Genre: Pop
- Length: 2:56
- Label: RCA
- Songwriters: Alecia Moore; Dan Reynolds; Jorgen Odegard
- Producer: Jorgen Odegard

"Hustle" is a song recorded by American singer Pink for her eighth studio album, Hurts 2B Human (2019). Pink co-wrote the song with Jorgen Odegard and Dan Reynolds, the lead vocalist of Imagine Dragons, and also provides additional vocals on the chorus, while the production was handled by Odegard, with additional production from Reynolds. It was released on March 28, 2019 by RCA Records as the album's first promotional single, along with the album pre-order.

An upbeat pop song with country influences, "Hustle" is lyrically center around a relationship gone wrong, with Pink warning her partner that he won't be able to take advantage of her again. The song received positive reviews from music critics who applauded its anthemic nature and the singer's attitude, as well as the lyrics and instrumentation. Commercially, "Hustle" achieved top-forty positions in Scotland and the digital charts of Canada and the United States. For promotion, an accompanying lyric video was uploaded onto Pink's official YouTube channel simultaneously with the song's release. She also performed the song at selected dates of her Beautiful Trauma World Tour (2018–2019) and on Jimmy Kimmel Live!.

== Background and release ==
"Hustle" was written by Pink, Jorgen Odegard and Dan Reynolds, the lead vocalist of the American pop rock band Imagine Dragons, while the production was solely handled by Odegard, with additional production from Reynolds. Recording took place at The Village Studios, in Los Angeles, assisted by recording engineer Gabe Burch, while mastering engineering was performed by Dave Kutch. Pink appeared on The Ellen DeGeneres Show on February 6, 2019 and stated that she will release new music, revealing that the album, titled Hurts 2B Human, was believed to be released around April 2019. On March 28, 2019, Pink revealed on her social media accounts that she will release a promotional single titled "Hustle", along with the album pre-order. The track was made available for digital download and streaming on all platforms, along with the official lyric video on YouTube.

== Composition and lyrics ==
"Hustle" is a pop song that lasts two minutes and fifty-six seconds. The upbeat composition is accompanied by an "electro-swing" in the verses, with Odegard providing the song's instrumentation, except the guitar that was played by Reynolds. Stephen Thomas Erlewine of AllMusic described the song as a "funky number", while Malvika Padin from Clash called the "country-tinged" instrumentals catchy and felt that they were added as an attempt to "experiment with new, more youthful" sounds.

Lyrically, the song talks about a relationship that went wrong, with Pink warning her partner that he won't be able to take advantage of her again, as she signs "You took my love, mistook it for weakness/ I guarantee I won’t repeat this, no/ Don’t try to hustle me" in the opening verse, over a "jumping juke-joint groove". The track eventually reaches the chorus in which Pink belts "Don't hustle me" several times. According to the music sheet published by Sony/ATV Music Publishing at Musicnotes.com, the track is composed in the key of A Minor with a moderate tempo of 97 beats per minute. Pink's vocals span a range of G_{3} to G_{5}, while its chord progression follows a basic sequence of Am-E_{7}-Am.

== Reception and promotion ==
Writing for The Quietus, Nick Roseblade listed "Hustle" and other two songs from Hurts 2B Human, "(Hey Why) Miss You Sometime" and "Can We Pretend", respectively, as "fun, infectious" pop songs that "made Pink a household name." Aimee Cliff from The Guardian described the track as "stomping [...] underdog me-against-the-world" anthem. Brandy Robidoux from Hollywood Life said that "Hustle" is a "hard-hitting, rockin' [...] badass anthem for the ages", while the "Bitch please" phrase is "likely sending anyone who's ever broken her heart running for the hills." Angelica Acevedo from Billboard felt that Pink is showing off "her country side" in the song, as well as giving "a classic bad-ass vibe". Mike Nied from Idolator described "Hustle" as a "sassy anthem" and noted how "[it] only picks up steam as she moves into the explosive chorus."

Pink promoted "Hustle" with several live performances. The singer included the song during her Beautiful Trauma World Tour (2018–2019) concert tour at selected dates, replacing the track "Smells Like Teen Spirit". On May 1, 2019, she appeared on Jimmy Kimmel Live! and performed "Hustle", accompanied by several backup singers and a nine-piece live band. Gil Kaufman from Billboard said that the performance was in an "old-school style", while Emily Zemler of Rolling Stone felt that Pink added an "uplifting vibe" to the song.

== Charts ==
| Chart (2019) | Peak position |
|---|---|
| Australia (ARIA) | 69 |
| Canada Digital Song Sales (Billboard) | 12 |
| Croatia (HRT) | 72 |
| New Zealand Hot Singles (RMNZ) | 12 |
| New Zealand Digital Song Sales (Billboard) | 4 |
| Poland Airplay (ZPAV) | 85 |
| Scottish Singles Sales (Official Charts) | 30 |
| Switzerland (Schweizer Hitparade) | 75 |
| US Digital Song Sales (Billboard) | 11 |
| US Pop Digital Songs (Billboard) | 6 |

== Certifications ==
Certifications for "Hustle"
| Region | Certification | Certified units/sales |
|---|---|---|
| Australia (ARIA) | Gold | 35,000^{‡} |
^{‡} Sales+streaming figures based on certification alone.

== Release history ==
| Region | Date | Format | Label | Ref. |
|---|---|---|---|---|
| Various | March 28, 2019 | Digital download | RCA | |
