= List of number-one albums of 2019 (Ireland) =

The Irish Albums Chart ranks the best-performing albums in Ireland, as compiled by the Official Charts Company on behalf of the Irish Recorded Music Association.

Issue date	Album	Artist	Reference
4 January	The Greatest Showman: Original Motion Picture Soundtrack	Various artists	
11 January	The Greatest Showman: Original Motion Picture Soundtrack	Various artists	
18 January	The Greatest Showman: Original Motion Picture Soundtrack	Various artists	
25 January	The Greatest Showman: Original Motion Picture Soundtrack	Various artists	
1 February	The Greatest Showman: Original Motion Picture Soundtrack	Various artists	
8 February	The Greatest Showman: Original Motion Picture Soundtrack	Various artists	
15 February	Thank U, Next	Ariana Grande	
22 February	Mdrn Lv	Picture This	
1 March	Thank U, Next	Ariana Grande	
8 March	Wasteland, Baby!	Hozier	
15 March	Wasteland, Baby!	Hozier	
22 March	Wasteland, Baby!	Hozier	
29 March	Mdrn Lv	Picture This	
5 April	When We All Fall Asleep, Where Do We Go?	Billie Eilish	
12 April	When We All Fall Asleep, Where Do We Go?	Billie Eilish	
19 April	When We All Fall Asleep, Where Do We Go?	Billie Eilish	
26 April	When We All Fall Asleep, Where Do We Go?	Billie Eilish	
3 May	Hurts 2B Human	Pink	
10 May	When We All Fall Asleep, Where Do We Go?	Billie Eilish	
17 May	When We All Fall Asleep, Where Do We Go?	Billie Eilish	
24 May	Divinely Uninspired to a Hellish Extent	Lewis Capaldi	
31 May	Divinely Uninspired to a Hellish Extent	Lewis Capaldi	
7 June	Divinely Uninspired to a Hellish Extent	Lewis Capaldi	
14 June	Divinely Uninspired to a Hellish Extent	Lewis Capaldi	
21 June	Western Stars	Bruce Springsteen	
28 June	Western Stars	Bruce Springsteen	
5 July	Divinely Uninspired to a Hellish Extent	Lewis Capaldi	
12 July	Mick Flannery	Mick Flannery	
19 July	No.6 Collaborations Project	Ed Sheeran	
26 July	No.6 Collaborations Project	Ed Sheeran	
2 August	No.6 Collaborations Project	Ed Sheeran	
9 August	No.6 Collaborations Project	Ed Sheeran	
16 August	We Are Not Your Kind	Slipknot	
23 August	No.6 Collaborations Project	Ed Sheeran	
30 August	Lover	Taylor Swift	
6 September	Lover	Taylor Swift	
13 September	Hollywood's Bleeding	Post Malone	
20 September	Hollywood's Bleeding	Post Malone	
27 September	Hollywood's Bleeding	Post Malone	
4 October	Divinely Uninspired to a Hellish Extent	Lewis Capaldi	
11 October	Without Fear	Dermot Kennedy	
18 October	Without Fear	Dermot Kennedy	
25 October	Without Fear	Dermot Kennedy	
1 November	Without Fear	Dermot Kennedy	
8 November	Without Fear	Dermot Kennedy	
15 November	Sunsets & Full Moons	The Script	
22 November	Spectrum	Westlife	
29 November	Spectrum	Westlife	
6 December	Without Fear	Dermot Kennedy	
13 December	You're in My Heart: Rod Stewart with the Royal Philharmonic Orchestra	Rod Stewart with the Royal Philharmonic Orchestra	
20 December	Fine Line	Harry Styles	
27 December	Without Fear	Dermot Kennedy	

== Number-one artists ==
Position	Artist	Weeks at No. 1
1	Dermot Kennedy	7
2	Billie Eilish	6
2	Lewis Capaldi	6
4	Ed Sheeran	5
5	Hozier	3
5	Post Malone	3
7	Ariana Grande	2
7	Picture This	2
7	Bruce Springsteen	2
7	Taylor Swift	2
7	Westlife	2
12	Pink	1
12	Mick Flannery	1
12	Slipknot	1
12	The Script	1
12	Rod Stewart	1
12	Royal Philharmonic Orchestra	1
12	Harry Styles	1

== See also ==
- List of number-one singles of 2019 (Ireland)
