= Try This =

Studio album by Pink
- Released: November 11, 2003
- Recorded: 2002–2003
- Studios: Steakhouse Studios (North Hollywood, California); The Transplants' Bus; Mansfield Lodge (Los Angeles); Crackertracks (Los Angeles); Turtle Sound (New York City, New York); Battery Studios (New York City); Casa de Pink (Sherman Oaks, California); Enterprise Studios (Burbank, California); Vibatorium (Los Angeles); Guerilla Canyon Studios (Los Angeles); House of Blues Studios (Los Angeles); Sarm West Studios (London, England)
- Genres: Pop; rock
- Length: 51:52
- Label: Arista
- Producers: Tim Armstrong; Billy Mann; Jonathan S. Davis; Damon Elliott; John Fields; William Orbit; Linda Perry

Pink chronology
Missundaztood (2001)	Try This (2003)	I'm Not Dead (2006)

Singles from Try This
- 1. "Trouble" Released: September 29, 2003; 2. "God Is a DJ" Released: November 17, 2003; 3. "Last to Know" Released: April 13, 2004

Try This is the third studio album by American singer Pink, released on November 11, 2003, by Arista Records. Wanting to expand on the rock sound she had explored on her previous record, Missundaztood, for Try This Pink collaborated with punk band Rancid's singer and guitarist Tim Armstrong, and reunited with Linda Perry, who produced most of the Missundaztood album. As a result of this collaboration, Try This is a rock and roll and pop record, with lyrics exploring such themes as love and estrangement.

Try This received generally favorable reviews from music critics. However, retrospectively Pink herself expressed dissatisfaction with the record. She said that she was unhappy with the way the label wanted her to make an album after the success of Missundaztood. Commercially, the album was moderately successful, reaching the top ten in 13 countries, including the US, where it peaked at number nine on the Billboard 200. Internationally, the album also fared well, peaking at number three in the UK, and number eight in Canada. It was certified Platinum in the US by the RIAA for shipments of over one million copies.

Three singles were released from the album. The lead single, "Trouble", reached the top ten in Australia, Canada, the UK, and many European countries. Trouble earned Pink her second Grammy Award, for Best Female Rock Vocal Performance at the 2004 Grammy Awards. "God Is a DJ" and "Last to Know", the second and third singles from the album respectively, were modestly successful in European charts. However, all of the singles from Try This failed to garner much success in the US. Some of the album pressings also included the single "Feel Good Time" from the soundtrack for the movie Charlie's Angels: Full Throttle. Pink supported the album with her Try This Tour in 2004, which performed across Europe and Australia. The live recording of the Manchester show was released in 2006, titled Pink: Live in Europe.

== Background and composition ==
After the success of Missundaztood (2001) and its accompanying worldwide Party Tour, Pink began work on her third studio album. Wanting to expand more on the rock sound she explored with Missundaztood, Pink sought out producers and writers that had experience within the genre. Most of the tracks on Try This were produced and co-written by punk band Rancid singer and guitarist Tim Armstrong, whom Pink met through a mutual friend at a Transplants video shoot. The two hit it off and Pink ended up co-writing ten songs with him in a week when Transplants were on a tour with the Foo Fighters. Eight of these tracks appeared on Try This, which also features three songs written with Linda Perry, who co-wrote much of Missundaztood, Pink's second album. The album includes a collaboration with electroclash artist Peaches, "Oh My God", and Pink's contribution to the Charlie's Angels: Full Throttle film soundtrack, "Feel Good Time" (produced by and featuring William Orbit), as a non-U.S. bonus track.

Try This was Pink's final studio album under Arista Records. In 2006, Pink said that she was unhappy with the way the label wanted her to make an album after the success of M!ssundaztood. "I was kind of rebelling against the label on that one," she said. "I was going: 'You want a record? Fine, I'll write 10 songs in a week for your fuckin' record and you can press it up and put it out.'" She described the promotional campaign for the album as "an awful time. I was walking out of half my interviews crying. I just felt they were putting a quarter in the slot to watch the monkey dance." Try This is Pink's first album to carry a Parental Advisory warning, and therefore her first album released alongside an edited version.

Try This is a pop/rock album that incorporates elements of punk rock ("Trouble"), R&B ("Catch Me While I'm Sleeping", "Love Song"), new wave and disco ("Humble Neighborhoods").

== Promotion ==
=== Singles ===
The album's first single, "Trouble", a song Armstrong originally wrote for his band Rancid in 2003, reached number two in Canada and the top ten in the UK and Australia, but it peaked only at number 68 on the U.S. Billboard Hot 100. In 2003, "Catch Me While I'm Sleeping" was issued as a promotional single in the U.S.; in the same period, a promo CD-R acetate of "Humble Neighborhoods" was made available in the UK. Follow-up single "God Is a DJ" failed to chart on the Hot 100, although it reached number 11 in the UK. A third single, "Last to Know", was released exclusively in Europe and peaked at 21 in the UK.

=== Tour ===
Pink embarked on the Try This Tour in Europe during 2004, and a DVD chronicling the tour was released in 2006.

=== Appearances in media ===
"Trouble" was used in the films White Chicks (2004), The Princess Diaries 2: Royal Engagement (2004) and Miss Congeniality 2: Armed and Fabulous (2005) as well as the first theatrical trailer for Tangled, and "God Is a DJ" was featured in the film Mean Girls (2004).

== Critical reception ==
Professional ratings
Aggregate scores
Source	Rating
Metacritic	71/100
Review scores
Source	Rating
AllMusic	4/5 stars
Blender	4/5 stars
Entertainment Weekly	B+
The Guardian	2/5 stars
NME	6/10
Q	4/5 stars
Rolling Stone	3/5 stars
Slant Magazine	3/5 stars
Spin	B
Stylus Magazine	B

The album received almost entirely positive reviews from critics, with an average Metacritic rating of 71, indicating "generally favorable reviews". AllMusic editor Stephen Thomas Erlewine rated the album four out of five stars. He found that "with Try This, Pink has firmly established a voice of her own, and in doing so, she's made another tremendous modern pop record." Blender critic James Slaughter felt that "with her third album, Pink has smartly navigated a way to be heard over the mass moaning that has followed her [...] The guitars are raunchier, the lyrics more potty-mouthed [but] the music never loses its melodic touch, whether essaying the gutsy rock or glossy Philly R&B balladry." Nick Catucci from The Village Voice noted that the album "dares Pink's huge but hardly guaranteed audience to hear the world her way — without wasting one moment on indulgent experimentation, rote grandstanding, or retreats into conformism [...]" Assisted by soft crusty-punk Tim Armstrong, Try This is a rare leap of faith — a miracle of pop."

David Browne, writing for Entertainment Weekly, gave the album a positive review and called it "A hooky, engaging throwaway that expands Pink's range while holding on fiercely to her irascible inner child." However, he was less impressed with Perry's contributions on Try This, further noting: "Maybe Pink isn't very different from her teen-pop refugees: She's a rebel only to a point, and she's more than willing to compromise her rawness for crossover pop success. Yet while her peers struggle to grime themselves up, Pink and her exuberantly junky pop still stand head and bustier above the rest." However, there were some negative reviews, with Ethan Brown from New York magazine stating that "Pink pitches a brand of seriousness that is pure Lifetime-TV mawkishness," while Alexis Petridis from The Guardian commented that "Like a lot of pop at the moment, it just sounds like a wan imitation of Pink's second album."

== Commercial performance ==
Try This debuted at number nine on the U.S. Billboard 200 with first-week sales of 147,000 copies, a weaker debut than that of Missundaztood. The album also reached the top ten on album charts in the UK, Canada and Australia. As of March 2007, it had sold 719,000 copies in the U.S. according to Nielsen SoundScan. Try This re-entered the Australian album chart in June 2009.

== Track listing ==
Try This – Standard version
No.	Title	Writer(s)	Producer(s)	Length
1.	"Trouble"	Pink; Tim Armstrong	Armstrong; John Fields^{[a]}	3:12
2.	"God Is a DJ"	Pink; Billy Mann; Jonathan S. Davis	Mann; Davis	3:44
3.	"Last to Know"	Pink; Armstrong	Armstrong	4:03
4.	"Tonight's the Night"	Pink; Armstrong	Armstrong	3:56
5.	"Oh My God" (featuring Peaches)	Pink; Armstrong; Merrill Nisker	Armstrong	3:42
6.	"Catch Me While I'm Sleeping"	Pink; Linda Perry	Perry; Fields^{[a]}	5:03
7.	"Waiting for Love"	Pink; Perry; Eric Schermerhorn; Paul Ill; Brian MacLeod	Perry	5:28
8.	"Save My Life"	Pink; Armstrong	Armstrong	3:16
9.	"Try Too Hard"	Pink; Perry	Perry; Fields^{[a]}	3:13
10.	"Humble Neighborhoods"	Pink; Armstrong	Armstrong; Fields^{[a]}	3:52
11.	"Walk Away"	Pink; Armstrong	Armstrong	3:38
12.	"Unwind"	Pink; Armstrong	Armstrong	3:12
13.	"Love Song"	Pink; Damon Elliott	Elliott	2:29
14.	"Hooker" (hidden track)	Pink; Armstrong	Armstrong	3:04
Total length:				51:52

Try This – International version and 2017 vinyl release
No.	Title	Writer(s)	Producer(s)	Length
13.	"Feel Good Time" (featuring William Orbit)	William Orbit; Beck Hansen; Jay Ferguson	Orbit	3:57
14.	"Love Song"	Pink; Damon Elliott	Elliott	2:29
15.	"Hooker" (hidden track)	Pink; Armstrong	Armstrong	3:04
Total length:				55:49

Try This – European enhanced bonus material
No.	Title	Length
16.	"Interview with P!nk"	5:27
17.	"Photo gallery"

Try This – Japanese bonus tracks
No.	Title	Writer(s)	Producer(s)	Length
13.	"Feel Good Time" (featuring William Orbit)	Orbit; Hansen; Ferguson	Orbit	3:57
14.	"Delirium"	Pink; Perry	Perry	3:41
15.	"Free"	Pink; Perry; Schermerhorn; Ill; MacLeod	Perry	6:41
16.	"Love Song"	Pink; Elliott	Elliott	2:29
17.	"Hooker" (hidden track)	Pink; Armstrong	Armstrong	3:04
Total length:				66:11

Try This – Limited edition bonus DVD
No.	Title	Length
1.	"Pink's Pix: Photo Gallery"
2.	"Album Lyrics"
3.	"The Many Faces of P!nk: Interview"
4.	"Feel Good Time Lifestyle: Featurette"
5.	"Trouble" (music video)	3:32

Notes

- ^{^[a]} signifies an additional producer.

== Personnel ==
Credits adapted from the album's liner notes.

- Pink – lead vocals
- Tim Armstrong – guitar, acoustic bass, keyboards, backup vocals, loops, sound effects, engineer, producer
- Jonnie "Most" Davis – guitar, acoustic guitar, bass, drum programming, producer, keyboards, engineer, arranger
- Linda Perry – guitar, sitar, mellotron, producer
- Damon Elliott – percussion, keyboards, programming, producer
- John Fields – bass, guitar, percussion, piano, keyboards, drums, wah wah guitar, programming, mixing, engineer, producer
- Robbie Campos – acoustic guitar, producer, keyboards, arranger
- Dave Carlock – organ, keyboards, bass, drum programming, backup vocals
- Matt Mahaffey – synthesizer, glockenspiel, turntables, omnichord, keyboards, drums
- Atticus Ross – synthesizer, percussion, loops, engineer
- Vic Ruggiero – piano, Hammond organ
- David Paich – organ, Hammond organ
- Grecco Buratto – guitar
- Eric Schermerhorn – guitar
- Steve Stevens – guitar
- Matt Freeman – bass
- Janis Tanaka – bass
- Nick Lane – trombone
- Lee Thornburg – trumpet
- Greg "Frosty" Smith – baritone sax
- Charlie Bisherat – violin
- Travis Barker – drums
- Dorian Crozier – drums
- Joshua Seth Eagan – percussion, drums
- Bryan Keeling – drums
- Brett Reed – percussion, drums
- Galadriel Masterson – backup vocals
- Hopey Rock – backup vocals
- Lon Price – horn arrangements
- Roger Davies – executive producer
- Craig Logan – executive producer
- Chris Lord-Alge – mixing
- Dave Pensado – mixing
- Brian Gardner – mastering
- David Guerrero – engineer
- Dylan Dresdow – engineer
- Padraic Kerin – engineer
- Steven Miller – engineer, mixing
- Tony Cooper – assistant engineer
- John "Silas" Cranfield – assistant engineer
- Pat Dammer – assistant engineer
- Jay Goin – assistant engineer
- Femio Hernández – assistant engineer
- Chris Testa – assistant engineer
- Ethan Willoughby – assistant engineer
- Joshua Sarubin – A&R
- Jeri Heiden – art direction, design
- Glen Nakasako – art direction, design
- Andrew McPherson – photography

== Charts ==
=== Weekly charts ===
Chart (2003–04)	Peak position
Australian Albums (ARIA)	8
Austrian Albums (Ö3 Austria)	2
Belgian Albums (Ultratop Flanders)	9
Belgian Albums (Ultratop Wallonia)	26
Canadian Albums (Billboard)	8
Danish Albums (Hitlisten)	16
Dutch Albums (Album Top 100)	8
Finnish Albums (Suomen virallinen lista)	39
French Albums (SNEP)	12
German Albums (Offizielle Top 100)	2
Hungarian Albums (MAHASZ)	29
Irish Albums (IRMA)	8
Italian Albums (FIMI)	51
Japanese Albums (Oricon)	26
New Zealand Albums (RMNZ)	24
Norwegian Albums (VG-lista)	5
Scottish Albums (Official Charts)	3
Swedish Albums (Sverigetopplistan)	8
Swiss Albums (Schweizer Hitparade)	1
UK Albums (Official Charts)	3
US Billboard 200	9

=== Year-end charts ===
Chart (2003)	Position
Austrian Albums (Ö3 Austria)	46
Dutch Albums (MegaCharts)	87
French Albums (SNEP)	174
German Albums (Offizielle Top 100)	65
Swedish Albums (Sverigetopplistan)	96
Swiss Albums (Schweizer Hitparade)	29
UK Albums (OCC)	55
US Billboard 200	66
Worldwide Albums (IFPI)	35
Chart (2004)	Position
Australian Albums (ARIA)	95
Austrian Albums (Ö3 Austria)	24
Dutch Albums (MegaCharts)	39
German Albums (Offizielle Top 100)	47
Swiss Albums (Schweizer Hitparade)	32
UK Albums (OCC)	130
US Billboard 200	150
Chart (2009)	Position
Australian Albums (ARIA)	80

== Certifications ==
Region	Certification	Certified units/sales
Australia (ARIA)	2× Platinum	140,000^{^}
Austria (IFPI Austria)	Platinum	30,000^{*}
Canada (Music Canada)	Platinum	100,000^{^}
Germany (BVMI)	3× Gold	300,000^{^}
Japan (Oricon Charts)	—	48,062
New Zealand (RMNZ)	Gold	7,500^{^}
Norway (IFPI Norway)	Gold	20,000^{*}
Russia (NFPF)	Gold	10,000^{*}
Switzerland (IFPI Switzerland)	Platinum	40,000^{^}
United Kingdom (BPI)	Platinum	300,000^{^}
United States (RIAA)	Platinum	1,000,000^{^}
Summaries
Europe (IFPI)	Platinum	1,000,000^{*}
Worldwide		2,700,000
^{*} Sales figures based on certification alone.^{^} Shipments figures based on certification alone.
