= Love Me Anyway =

2019 single by Pink featuring Chris Stapleton

Single by Pink featuring Chris Stapleton

from the album Hurts 2B Human
- Released: September 17, 2019
- Recorded: 2015, 2019
- Studio: The Village (Los Angeles, California) Grand Central South
- Genre: Country rock
- Length: 3:09
- Label: RCA
- Songwriters: Pink; Allen Shamblin; Tom Douglas
- Producers: Pink; Sal Oliveri; Simon Gooding

Pink singles chronology
| "Hurts 2B Human" (2019) | "Love Me Anyway" (2019) | "One Too Many" (2020) |

Chris Stapleton singles chronology
| "Blow" (2019) | "Love Me Anyway" (2019) | "Starting Over" (2020) |

"Love Me Anyway" is a song by American singer Pink from her eighth studio album, Hurts 2B Human (2019). It features American country singer Chris Stapleton and was released as the fourth and final single from the album.

== Composition ==
The song was written by Pink, Allen Shamblin, and Tom Douglas. It runs for three minutes and nine seconds and was produced by Sal Oliveri and Simon Gooding. Strings were arranged, recorded and performed by Stevie Blacke, and the pedal steel guitar was recorded and performed by Matt Kelly.

== Release ==
The song was officially released to country radio on September 17, 2019, after already charting on the Billboard Country Airplay chart in May and June 2019.

== Commercial performance ==
"Love Me Anyway" reached No. 20 on the Billboard Adult Top 40 chart. The song had sold 171,000 copies in the United States as of December 2019.

== Live performances ==
"Love Me Anyway" was performed at Madison Square Garden by Pink and Chris Stapleton on May 22, 2019.

On November 13, 2019, Pink and Stapleton performed the song at the 53rd Annual Country Music Association Awards.

== Charts ==
| Chart (2019–2020) | Peak position |
|---|---|
| Canada AC (Billboard) | 47 |
| Canada Digital Song Sales (Billboard) | 5 |
| Canada Hot AC (Billboard) | 44 |
| New Zealand Hot Singles (RMNZ) | 24 |
| US Billboard Hot 100 | 96 |
| US Adult Pop Airplay (Billboard) | 20 |
| US Country Airplay (Billboard) | 52 |

== Certifications ==
| Region | Certification | Certified units/sales |
|---|---|---|
| Australia (ARIA) | Gold | 35,000^{‡} |
| Canada (Music Canada) | Gold | 40,000^{‡} |
| New Zealand (RMNZ) | Gold | 15,000^{‡} |
^{‡} Sales+streaming figures based on certification alone.

== Release history ==
| Region | Date | Format(s) | Label(s) | Ref. |
|---|---|---|---|---|
| United States | September 17, 2019 | Country radio | RCA | |
| United States | November 18, 2019 | Adult contemporary radio | RCA | |
