= Hurts 2B Human =

Studio album by Pink
- Released: April 26, 2019
- Recorded: 2018–19
- Studios: The Village (Los Angeles, California); Wolf Cousins (Stockholm, Sweden); Roundhead (Auckland, New Zealand); Record Plant (Los Angeles); Echo (Los Angeles); Earthstar Creation Center (Venice, California); MXM (West Hollywood, California); Grand Central South (Nashville, Tennessee); Henson (Los Angeles)
- Genre: Pop
- Length: 47:03
- Label: RCA
- Producers: Cash Cash; Simon Gooding; Oscar Görres; Greg Kurstin; Billy Mann; Max Martin; Kyle Moorman; Jorgen Odegard; Sal Oliveri; Pink; Dan Reynolds; Steve Robson; Shellback; The Struts; Ryan Tedder; Peter Thomas; Wrabel

Pink chronology
Beautiful Trauma (2017)	Hurts 2B Human (2019)	All I Know So Far: Setlist (2021)

Singles from Hurts 2B Human
- 1. "Walk Me Home" Released: February 20, 2019; 2. "Can We Pretend" Released: June 21, 2019; 3. "Hurts 2B Human" Released: September 6, 2019; 4. "Love Me Anyway" Released: September 16, 2019

Hurts 2B Human is the eighth studio album by American singer-songwriter Pink. Released on April 26, 2019, by RCA Records, the album was initially planned as a standalone extended play (EP). Pursuing a sound that would be a departure from her previous albums, Pink enlisted the assistance of collaborators such as Greg Kurstin, Max Martin, and Ryan Tedder. The album features guest appearances by Cash Cash, Khalid, Chris Stapleton, and Wrabel. Musically, Hurts 2B Human is a pop record whose lyrics delve into themes of love, family, introspection, life, and self-worth.

Pink officially announced Hurts 2B Human during her interview on The Ellen DeGeneres Show broadcast in February 2019. "Walk Me Home" was released as the lead single to commercial success, peaking within the top-ten charts of several countries, including Ireland, Switzerland, and the United Kingdom. The second single "Can We Pretend" followed it, while the title track and "Love Me Anyway" had a limited release. To promote the album, she added it to her Beautiful Trauma World Tour for the 2019 shows.

Hurts 2B Human received generally favorable reviews from music critics, many of whom praised its production and cohesiveness; others felt it was too calculated and formulaic. The album reached number one in eight countries including The UK, Australia, Canada, New Zealand, and Switzerland. In the United States, Hurts 2B Human became Pink's third consecutive album to debut at number one on the Billboard 200 chart. The Australian Recording Industry Association (ARIA) awarded it a platinum certification.

== Background ==
Pink released her seventh studio album Beautiful Trauma in October 2017 to positive reviews. In 2017, it was the third global best-selling album, and as of 2018 it had sold over three million units worldwide. Beautiful Trauma earned Pink two Grammy nominations, one in 2018 and another in the 2019 ceremony. Pink embarked on the Beautiful Trauma World Tour, which began in March 2018 and ended in November 2019, to further promote the album. On January 26, 2019, Pink appeared on The Ellen DeGeneres Show for an interview. When asked about new music, Pink announced that a song titled "Walk Me Home" would be released in two weeks, while the album, titled Hurts 2B Human, was expected to be released in April 2019.

The album's cover was unveiled on February 28, after Pink uploaded three teasers on her social media. Photographed by Andrew Macpherson and designed by Hueman, the image features an artistic and colorful representation of the left side of Pink's face. It includes an array of warm and bright colors, giving the sense of a watercolor-like painting. During an interview with Entertainment Weekly, the singer said that she chose to name the album Hurts 2B Human because the title track "hit a string in [her] that just resonates" and it felt "the most true to what's going on right now".

== Development and composition ==
Opportunities kept coming up for me to work with all these incredible people, and I think that's what this record is all about: the village it took to create it.

— Pink on the development process of Hurts 2B Human

Recording sessions for Hurts 2B Human coincided with the Beautiful Trauma World Tour, with up to twenty songs being composed and considered for inclusion. Pink explained that the creative process was different in comparison to that of her previous albums. She added, "I usually go on tour and stop writing altogether, but we just never stopped". Initially planned as a standalone extended play (EP), the recorded material turned into a full body of work as the sessions continued to progress. Pink recalled that "it came together without me knowing that I was making an album". Sessions took place at: The Village Studios, MXM Studios, Echo Studio in Los Angeles, Earthstar Creation Center in Venice, Grand Central South in Brentwood, Wolf Cousins Studios in Stockholm, and Roundhead Studios in Auckland. The development process was described by the singer as "a pebble that rolled downhill and became [a] boulder".

Musically, Pink claimed that Hurts 2B Human is a departure from the "angsty and marital" nature of her previous albums, and compared the songs to group therapy. Inspiration for the songwriting came from the melancholy and pressure of current society as well as pain, the latter being considered a motivator and "something worth talking about". The singer also revealed that motherhood had a positive impact on her music and life, helping her to become more open, confident, and thoughtful. Many prominent musicians made guest appearances on the album. Pink invited Wrabel at her home studio, and the pair wrote "90 Days" together with Steve Robson. Wrabel later said during an interview for Get Out! Magazine that the song talks about "having to fall out of love with someone to someone becoming sober", adding that it was incredibly special for him. Khalid was approached by Pink for the title track, "Hurts 2B Human", because she enjoyed his voice and the idea behind the song. The singer said in an interview for Zane Lowe's Beats 1 radio show that the lyrics discuss the human experience and "the circle you create around you" to overcome rough times. Another collaboration included on Hurts 2B Human is with the electronic group Cash Cash on "Can We Pretend", a song Pink said she had a fun experience making. Influenced by Lee Ann Womack and her 2000 single, "I Hope You Dance", Pink contacted Chris Stapleton for a collaboration. After he responded positively, Pink traveled to Nashville and wrote "Love Me Anyway" with Allen Shamblin and Tom Douglas.

== Music and lyrical interpretation ==
Hurts 2B Human is primarily a pop album that integrates elements of dance and country music. Most critics felt that the record consists mainly of radio-friendly power ballads. The album opens with "Hustle", an upbeat pop song with country influences. Chris DeVille of Stereogum described it as "jazzy, bluesy retro" and "finger-snapper". Thematically, it delves into a relationship gone wrong, with the singer warning her partner that he will not be able to take advantage of her again. The second track, "(Hey Why) Miss You Sometime", is a dance-pop track. The song finds Pink missing a person who hurt her in the past. She sings a heavily Auto-Tuned vocal. "Walk Me Home" is a pop song with country elements and "flourishes of digitised vocal production", considered a "fresh touch" in Pink's discography by Aimee Cliff of The Guardian. "My Attic", the fourth track, is an introspective ballad. It contains "raspy" vocals and "poetic" lyrics about storing memories and secrets. Wrabel is a featured guest the next song, "90 Days", which is a minimalist electronica ballad accompanied by a piano and "Vocoder-enhanced harmonies". It depicts a relationship turned sour in which a partner has doubts and fears that their love will end. Both Alexa Camp of Slant Magazine and Amy O'Connor of The Irish Times compared "90 Days" with Imogen Heap's song "Hide and Seek" (2005).

The title track features Khalid. Its composition consists of an "EDM beat, plucky electric guitar chord" and synths, while lyrically the song finds the singers acknowledging the struggles that individuals face everyday and celebrating the power of bringing people together. The seventh track, "Can We Pretend", is an EDM and dance-pop song featuring Cash Cash. Its lyrics emphasize using nostalgia as a way of escapism from the "less than ideal" present reality, with Pink singing: "Hell yeah/Can we pretend? 'Cause honestly, reality, it bores me". "Courage" is an acoustic "slow-build" power ballad with "nervy" vocals. Thom Murphy of the Washington Blade compared the song's hook with Katy Perry's "Chained to the Rhythm" (2017). "Happy", the ninth song, describes Pink's fear of opening up and her insecurities while growing up, as she sings: "Since I was 17, I've always hated my body, and it feels like my body hated me". Pink revealed that this line was inspired by a miscarriage she suffered at the age of seventeen, saying that "when [it] happens to a woman or a young girl, you feel like your body hates you and like your body is broken, and it's not doing what it's supposed to do".

"We Could Have It All" is a "groove-heavy" pop rock song. According to Mike Wass of Idolator, it "captures the feeling of defeat when you have ruined a good thing and don't know quite how". The album's eleventh track is "Love Me Anyway", a country ballad which features Chris Stapleton. It portrays the act of commitment in a relationship and the obstacles which may occur, with lyrics such as the opening lines, "Even if you see my scars, even if I break your heart/ If we're a million miles apart, do you think you'd walk away?" Maura Johnston of Entertainment Weekly called Pink's vocals "roughhewn", while Sean Maunier of Metro Weekly felt the duet worked because Stapleton's voice is "fading into the background". For the penultimate song, "Circle Game", Pink reflects upon motherhood, mortality and "growing up to become the parental figure she once looked up to". A piano-driven ballad, deemed as a "very personal offering", it also focuses on topics like her relationship with her daughter, and childhood vulnerabilities that Pink has carried into adulthood. The singer said that the track was inspired by her dad, saying: "He was my first hero. He was my God when I was a little girl. He's who taught me to fight for what I believe in. He's a big part of me." The album concludes with "The Last Song of Your Life", an acoustic folk ballad with melancholic undertones and "a devastating appeal for honesty and authenticity".

== Release and promotion ==
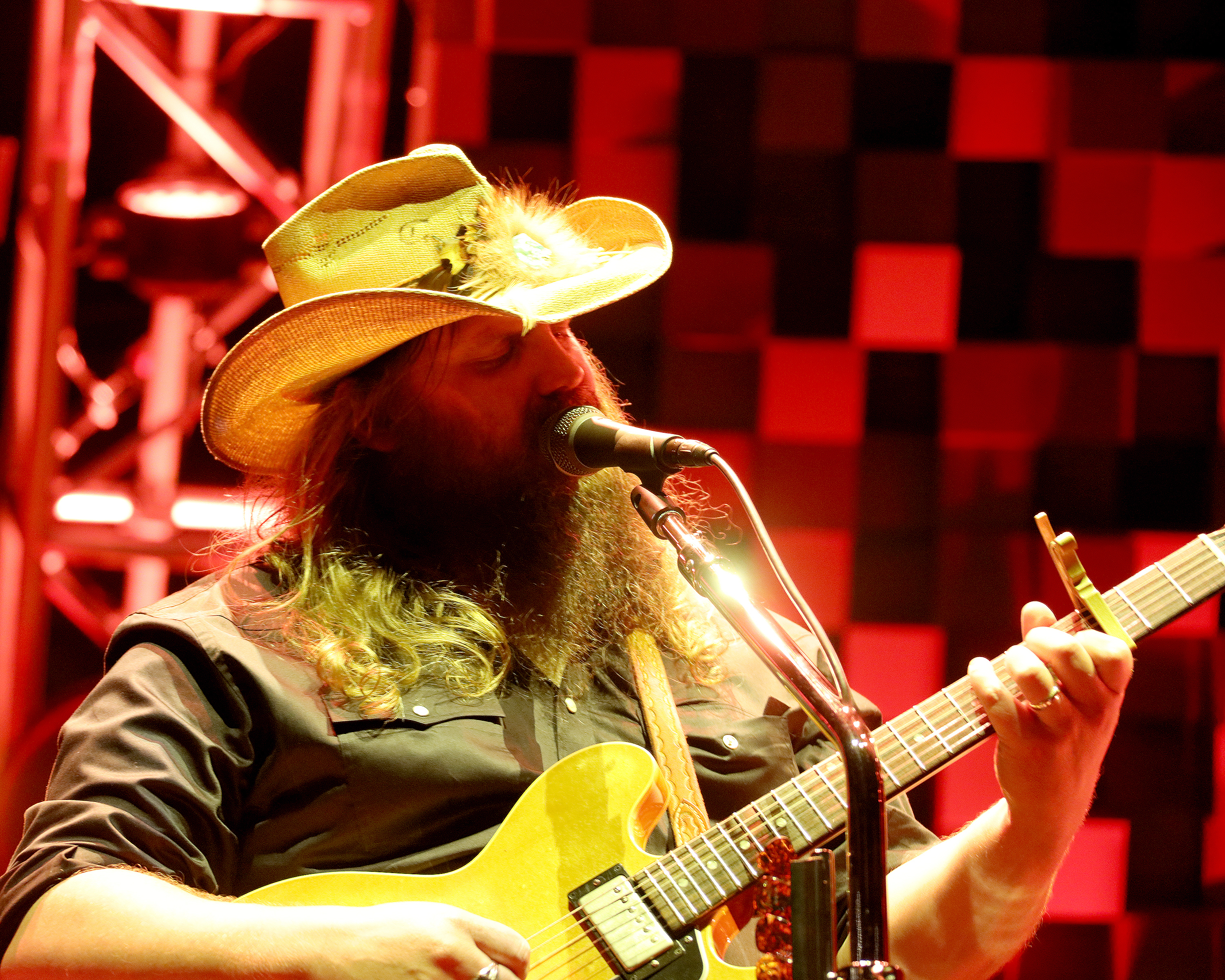
"Love Me Anyway" features country singer Chris Stapleton. Pink described the collaboration as "one of the greatest honors of my life".

Hurts 2B Human was released eighteen months after Beautiful Trauma and marked the shortest period of time between studio albums in Pink's career. The album's release was preceded by several singles and promotional singles. "Walk Me Home" was released on February 20 as the lead single from Hurts 2B Human. On the same day, Pink performed the song as part of a medley at the 2019 Brit Awards. "Walk Me Home" received positive reviews from music critics, who commended its anthemic approach and production. The song achieved commercial success and reached top-ten positions on the charts of several countries, including Finland, Ireland, Switzerland and the United Kingdom. In the United States, it peaked within the top fifty of the Billboard Hot 100 chart and topped the Billboard Dance Club Songs, Adult Contemporary and Adult Pop Songs charts, becoming her tenth number-one single on the latter and extending her record as the solo artist with the most number-ones on the chart. The song's accompanying music video was directed by Michael Gracey and released a month later; it portrays Pink dancing with multiple shadows in an empty city. "Walk Me Home" received a nomination in the category of Best Song at the 2020 Global Awards.

"Hustle" was released on March 28 as the first promotional single from Hurts 2B Human, along with the album pre-order. "Can We Pretend" was first released as the second promotional single, on April 11. On the following month, it was released as the second official single in Australia, later being sent to adult contemporary radio stations in the United States on July 22, 2019. It reached number one on the Billboard Dance Club Songs chart, becoming Pink's seventh song to do so, as well as the first number one song for Cash Cash. On April 22, the album's title track was released as the third promotional single. On the same day, Pink appeared on The Ellen DeGeneres Show and performed "Walk Me Home". On May 1, the singer appeared on Jimmy Kimmel Live! and performed "Hustle". A music video for "90 Days" was released on June 18. Described as "emotional", the video presents the "toil of being a touring musician with a family." Ten days later, a music video for "Can We Pretend" was released, showing an animated version of Pink going on a space exploration. On August 30, "Hurts 2B Human" was released in selected territories as the album's third single. "Love Me Anyway" was first serviced to country on September 17 and later, on November 18, to adult contemporary radio in the United States as the final single from Hurts 2B Human. A day later, the music video for the title track was released. Directed by Alissa Torvinen, the video of "Hurts 2B Human" features individuals in a New York City apartment "undergoing the daily stresses of life". On November 13, Pink performed "Love Me Anyway" with Chris Stapleton at the 53rd Annual Country Music Association Awards.

== Critical reception ==
Professional ratings
Aggregate scores
Source	Rating
AnyDecentMusic?	6.3/10
Metacritic	71/100
Review scores
Source	Rating
AllMusic	3.5/5 stars
The Arts Desk	4/5 stars
Clash	7/10
Entertainment Weekly	B
Evening Standard	3/5 stars
The Guardian	3/5 stars
The Irish Times	3/5 stars
Rolling Stone	3/5 stars
Slant Magazine	2.5/5 stars
Tom Hull – on the Web	B+

Hurts 2B Human received generally positive reviews from contemporary music critics. At Metacritic, which assigns a normalized rating out of 100 to reviews from mainstream critics, the album received an average score of 71, based on nine reviews. Another music-aggregator AnyDecentMusic? gave Hurts 2B Human 6.3 out of 10, based on their assessment of the critical consensus.

In a positive review, Stephen Thomas Erlewine of AllMusic gave the album a four-out-of-five rating. He found the record "generally a light affair" from the singer, and felt that the blending of different musical styles made it cohesive sonically. Erlewine concluded by saying that Hurts 2B Human "feels stylish and fashionable" while staying true to the "emotional gravity" that Pink has accumulated during her career. Maura Johnston of Entertainment Weekly, who gave the album a "B" rating, commented that the optimistic nature of the album makes it enjoyable and relatable, and found country pop influences that show "how [Pink's] true-to-life lyrics and soulful bellow can play in Nashville's finest honky-tonks."

Mikael Wood wrote for Los Angeles Times that Hurts 2B Human comes off as "strikingly aligned", pointing out the songs' messages about "overcoming obstacles and learning to trust in their abilities" in contrast to the music of younger artists that approach topics such as depression and drug consumption. Chris DeVille of Stereogum said that the album showcases an artist "who's found her comfort zone and has successfully grown her music up along with her", but disapproved the overly emotional songs that provide a feeling of "mere product". Writing for Rolling Stone, Sarah Grant characterized the record as "passionately confessional" and cited "Courage" and "Happy" as songs that find Pink at "[the] most brazen and heartbroken she's ever sounded", comparing the latter with the "patron saint" nature of her second studio album, Missundaztood (2001).

Malvika Padin of Clash labelled it "a collection of anthemic pop tracks threaded through with her bold vocals". Mike Wass of Idolator considered Hurts 2B Human to be Pink's best album since Funhouse (2008) and simply described it as "an accessible pop album for adults." Both Aimee Cliff of The Guardian and Amy O'Connor of Irish Times awarded the album three out of five stars. Cliff called the ballads that highlight Pink's vocals stand-out moments, but opined that the album fails to give a "sense of constant evolution". O'Connor shared a similar sentiment, feeling that the formulaic songwriting was an attempt to replicate the success of Beautiful Trauma (2017) and called Hurts 2B Human "a little too safe to really pack a punch." Nevertheless, she commended songs like "Can We Pretend" and "90 Days", calling the former "an ideal showcase" of the singer's personality. In a negative review for Slant Magazine, Alexa Camp noted that the collaborations don't manage to "add much more than mere texture to the proceedings", but praised the "otherworldly quality" of "90 Days".

== Commercial performance ==
Hurts 2B Human debuted at number one on the Billboard 200 chart of the United States, selling 115,000 album-equivalent units in the week ending May 2 according to Nielsen SoundScan. It became Pink's third album to top the chart, following The Truth About Love (2012) and Beautiful Trauma (2017). Hurts 2B Human was also the second best-selling album of the week, with pure album sales of 95,000 copies. The following week, Billboard reported that the album had dropped five places on the Billboard 200, with sales decreasing 68% to 36,000 units. By June 2019, the album had sold 158,000 pure album sales in the US. In Canada, the record debuted at number one on the Canadian Albums Chart, selling 13,000 units in its first week, according to the Canadian SoundScan.

In the United Kingdom, the album debuted at the top of the UK Albums Chart, with first week sales of 48,861 copies (including 4,359 from stream-equivalent units), outselling its closest competitor, The Balance by Catfish and the Bottlemen, by 22,000 units. It became her third chart-topping album there. The following week, Hurts 2B Human remained at the summit of the chart, selling 16,713 equivalent units. It became her first album to spend more than one week at the top in the country. The record continued to hold the number one spot for a third week in a row, with 11,582 equivalent units. Hurts 2B Human received a gold certification from the British Phonographic Industry (BPI) for selling over 100,000 units in the country. Across Europe, the album reached the top of the charts in Belgium (Flanders), Ireland, the Netherlands, Scotland, and Switzerland, and the top ten in other nations, including France, Portugal, Norway, Sweden and Finland.

In Australia, Hurts 2B Human debuted at number one on the ARIA Albums Chart, becoming Pink's sixth chart-topping album there. The album marked her forty-first week atop the chart, breaking her tie with Adele and ranking her at number five on the list of artists with most accumulated weeks at the top. It also gave her the distinction of being the female artist with the most cumulative weeks at number one, as well as placing her second on the list of female artists with the most chart-topping albums, behind only Madonna. Subsequently, Hurts 2B Human spent a total of three weeks at number one on the chart, and was certified platinum by the Australian Recording Industry Association (ARIA) for shipments of 70,000 copies. In New Zealand, the record also debuted at the top spot on the Official New Zealand Music Chart, and became Pink's third number one album. It received a gold certification from the Recorded Music NZ for shipments of over 7,500 units.

== Track listing ==
Standard edition
No.	Title	Writer(s)	Producer(s)	Length
1.	"Hustle"	Alecia Moore; Dan Reynolds; Jorgen Odegard	Odegard; Reynolds^{[a]}	2:55
2.	"(Hey Why) Miss You Sometime"	Moore; Max Martin; Shellback	Shellback; Martin	3:23
3.	"Walk Me Home"	Moore; Scott Harris; Nate Ruess	Peter Thomas; Kyle Moorman	2:59
4.	"My Attic"	Julia Michaels; Ilsey Juber; Freddy Wexler	The Struts; Freddy Wexler	3:02
5.	"90 Days" (featuring Wrabel)	Moore; Stephen Wrabel; Steve Robson	Robson; Wrabel; Simon Gooding^{[a]}	3:50
6.	"Hurts 2B Human" (featuring Khalid)	Moore; Teddy Geiger; Harris; Anna-Catherine Hartley; Alexander "Xplicit" Izquierdo; Khalid Robinson	Odegard	3:22
7.	"Can We Pretend" (featuring Cash Cash)	Moore; Ryan Tedder; Jean Paul Makhlouf; Alex Makhlouf; Samuel Frisch	Cash Cash; Tedder	3:44
8.	"Courage"	Moore; Greg Kurstin; Sia Furler	Kurstin	4:19
9.	"Happy"	Moore; Geiger; Alexandra Yatchenko; Steph Jones	Oscar Görres; Geiger^{[b]}	3:01
10.	"We Could Have It All"	Moore; Kurstin; Beck Hansen	Kurstin	4:33
11.	"Love Me Anyway" (featuring Chris Stapleton)	Moore; Allen Shamblin; Tom Douglas	Pink; Sal Oliveri^{[a]}; Simon Gooding^{[a]}	3:08
12.	"Circle Game"	Moore; Kurstin	Kurstin	4:54
13.	"The Last Song of Your Life"	Moore; Billy Mann	Mann; Pink	3:53
Total length:				47:03

Japanese bonus track
No.	Title	Writer(s)	Producer(s)	Length
14.	"More"	Moore; Jetta John-Hartley; busbee	busbee	3:50
Total length:				50:53

=== Notes ===
- ^{^a} signifies an additional producer.
- ^{^b} signifies a vocal producer.

== Credits and personnel ==
Credits were adapted from the liner notes.

=== Locations ===
==== Recording ====
- The Village (Los Angeles, California) – recording (tracks 1, 7, 9, 11)
- Wolf Cousins Studios (Stockholm, Sweden) – recording (tracks 4, 9)
- Roundhead Studios (Auckland, New Zealand) – vocals (tracks 4, 14(bonus))
- Record Plant (Los Angeles) – vocals (track 6)
- Echo Studio (Los Angeles) – recording (tracks 8, 10, 12)
- Earthstar Creation Center (Venice, California) – recording (tracks 8, 10, 12), vocals (track 9)
- MXM (West Hollywood, California) – recording (track 9)
- Grand Central South – recording (track 11)
- Henson Recording Studios – recording (track 12)

==== Additional recording ====
- Studio Borgen (Partille, Sweden) – strings arranging, strings, editing (track 4)
- Record Plant (Los Angeles) – guitars (track 6)
- Roundhead Studios (Auckland, New Zealand) – strings & piano recording (track 14(bonus))

==== Engineering ====
- MXM (Los Angeles) – engineering (track 2) & (Stockholm) – engineering (track 2)
- Earthstar Creation Center (Venice, California) – engineering (tracks 9, 13)

==== Mixing and mastering ====
- Roundhead Studios (Auckland, New Zealand) – mixing (tracks 3, 5, 11)
- Cash Cash Studios (Roseland, New Jersey) – mixing (track 7)
- Earthstar Creation Center (Venice, California) – mixing (track 13)
- MixStar Studios (Virginia Beach, VA)
- The Mastering Palace (New York)

=== Technical and composing ===
- Pink – vocals, background vocals (tracks 2, 9), executive production, production (tracks 11, 13)
- Wrabel – featured vocals, production (track 5)
- Khalid – featured vocals (track 6)
- Chris Stapleton – featured vocals (track 11)
- Jorden Odegard – all instruments (except guitar) (track 1), keyboards, strings, programming (track 6), production (tracks 1, 6)
- Dan Reynolds – guitar, additional production (track 1)
- Shellback – background vocals, keyboards, guitars, bass, drums, production, programming (track 2)
- Max Martin – keyboards, production, programming (track 2)
- Peter Thomas – background vocals, gang vocals, synthesizer, electric guitar, percussion, drums, handclaps, production, programming (track 3)
- Kyle Moorman – background vocals, gang vocals, synthesizer, electric guitar, percussion, drums, handclaps, production, programming (track 3)
- Ludvig Soderberg – keyboards, bass, programming (track 4)
- Jakob Jeristrom – keyboards, bass, programming (track 4)
- Ilsey Juber – guitar (track 4)
- Rami Yacoub – additional guitar (track 4)
- Mattias Johansson – violin (track 4)
- David Bukovinszky – cello (track 4)
- Michael Engstrom – double bass (track 4)
- Mattias Bylund – strings arranging, recording, editing (track 4)
- Steve Robson – piano, production, programming (track 5)
- Teddy Geiger – guitar (track 6), vocal production (track 9)
- Alexander Makhlouf – keyboards, synths, production, mixing (track 7)
- Samuel Frisch – drum programming, production (track 7)
- Jean-Paul Makhlouf – editing, sound design, production (track 7)
- Greg Kurstin – piano, guitar, bass, synthesizers, production (tracks 8, 10, 12), drums keyboards (track 8), keyboards (track 10), drums, rhodes (track 12)
- Oscar Görres – keyboards, guitar, bass, percussion, drums, production, programming (track 9)
- Sasha Sloan – background vocals (track 9)
- Taylor Hawkins – drums (track 10)
- Sal Oliveri – piano, bass, additional production (track 11)
- Stevie Blacke – strings arranged & performing (track 11)
- Matt Kelly – pedal steel (track 11)
- Songa Lee – violin (track 12)
- Josefina Vergara – violin (track 12)
- Alma Fernandez – viola (track 12)
- Jacob Braun – cello (tracks 12, 14 (bonus))
- billymann – acoustic guitar, production, engineering, mixing (track 13)
- The Struts – production (track 4)
- Simon Gooding – additional production (tracks 5, 11), vocals recording (tracks 3–6), engineering, mixing (tracks 3, 5, 11), Pink vocals recording (track 14 (bonus))
- Ryan Tedder – production, vocal production (track 7)
- busbee – production, strings arranging, piano, editing(track 14 (bonus))
- Andrew Duckles – viola (track 14 (bonus))
- Suzie Katayama – cello (track 14 (bonus))
- Dave Stone – bass (track 14 (bonus))

=== Recording ===
- Gabe Burch – recording (tracks 1, 9, 11)
- Denis Kosiak – vocals recording (track 6)
- Jonathan Edward Jaworski – vocals recording (track 8)
- Veronica Jane Wyman – guitars recording (track 6), vocals recording, engineering (track 9)
- Michael Illbert – engineering (track 2)
- Sam Holland – engineering (track 2)
- Cory Bice – engineering assistant (track 2), recording (track 9)
- Jeremy Lertola – engineering assistant (track 2)
- Greg Kurstin – engineering (tracks 8, 10, 12)
- Alex Pasco – engineering (tracks 8, 10, 12)
- Julian Burg – engineering (tracks 8, 10, 12)
- Matt Tuggle – engineering assistant (track 12)
- David Campbell – strings orchestrad, strings conductor (track 14 (bonus))
- Steve Churchyard – strings & piano recording (track 14 (bonus))
- John Costello – engineering assistant (track 14 (bonus))
- Nico Wellmann – engineering assistant (track 14 (bonus))
- Ryan Daly – editing (track 14 (bonus))
- Serban Ghenea – album mixing
- John Hanes – engineered for mix (all tracks)
- Dave Kutch – mastering (all tracks)

=== Management ===
- Keith Naftaly – A&R
- Roger Davies – management
- Bill Buntain – management
- Shady Farshadfar – management
- Irene Taylor – management
- Lisa Garrett – management
- Nikki Mestrovic – management
- Donald Passman – legal
- Gene Satomon – legal
- Helen Stotler – legal
- Nancy Chapman – business affairs
- Teresa Polyak – business affairs
- Hueman – cover painting
- Andrew Macpherson – photography
- Jeri Heiden – art direction and design
- Nick Steinharbt – art direction and design

== Charts ==
=== Weekly charts ===
Chart (2019)	Peak position
Australian Albums (ARIA)	1
Austrian Albums (Ö3 Austria)	2
Belgian Albums (Ultratop Flanders)	1
Belgian Albums (Ultratop Wallonia)	6
Canadian Albums (Billboard)	1
Czech Albums (ČNS IFPI)	4
Danish Albums (Hitlisten)	16
Dutch Albums (Album Top 100)	1
Finnish Albums (Suomen virallinen lista)	10
French Albums (SNEP)	7
German Albums (Offizielle Top 100)	2
Hungarian Albums (MAHASZ)	10
Irish Albums (IRMA)	1
Italian Albums (FIMI)	28
Japan Hot Albums (Billboard Japan)	27
Japanese Albums (Oricon)	53
Latvian Albums (LAIPA)	12
Lithuanian Albums (AGATA)	10
New Zealand Albums (RMNZ)	1
Norwegian Albums (VG-lista)	7
Polish Albums (ZPAV)	12
Portuguese Albums (AFP)	8
Scottish Albums (Official Charts)	1
Slovak Albums (ČNS IFPI)	12
South Korean Albums (Gaon)	67
Spanish Albums (Promusicae)	14
Swedish Albums (Sverigetopplistan)	8
Swiss Albums (Schweizer Hitparade)	1
UK Albums (Official Charts)	1
US Billboard 200	1
US Indie Store Album Sales (Billboard)	4

=== Year-end charts ===
Chart (2019)	Position
Australian Albums (ARIA)	3
Austrian Albums (Ö3 Austria)	53
Belgian Albums (Ultratop Flanders)	31
Belgian Albums (Ultratop Wallonia)	124
Canadian Albums (Billboard)	50
Dutch Albums (Album Top 100)	51
French Albums (SNEP)	106
German Albums (Offizielle Top 100)	44
Irish Albums (IRMA)	47
New Zealand Albums (RMNZ)	15
Swedish Albums (Sverigetopplistan)	72
Swiss Albums (Schweizer Hitparade)	24
UK Albums (OCC)	23
US Billboard 200	149
Worldwide Albums (IFPI)	15

== Certifications ==
Region	Certification	Certified units/sales
Australia (ARIA)	Platinum	70,000^{‡}
Canada (Music Canada)	Platinum	80,000^{‡}
France (SNEP)	Gold	50,000^{‡}
Germany (BVMI)	Gold	100,000^{‡}
New Zealand (RMNZ)	Platinum	15,000^{‡}
Poland (ZPAV)	Gold	10,000^{‡}
Switzerland (IFPI Switzerland)	Gold	10,000^{‡}
United Kingdom (BPI)	Gold	100,000^{‡}
^{‡} Sales+streaming figures based on certification alone.

== Release history ==
List of regions and release dates, showing formats, label, editions and references
Region	Date	Formats	Label	Editions	Ref.
Various	April 26, 2019	CD; digital download; streaming	RCA	Explicit; clean	
United States	June 21, 2019	Vinyl	RCA	Explicit; clean	

== See also ==
- List of Billboard 200 number-one albums of 2019
- List of number-one albums of 2019 (Australia)
- List of number-one albums of 2019 (Belgium)
- List of number-one albums of 2019 (Canada)
- List of number-one albums of 2019 (Ireland)
- List of number-one albums from the 2010s (New Zealand)
- List of number-one albums of 2019 (Scotland)
- List of number-one hits of 2019 (Switzerland)
- List of UK Albums Chart number ones of the 2010s
- List of UK Album Downloads Chart number ones of the 2010s
