= Walk Me Home (Pink song) =

Single by Pink

from the album Hurts 2B Human
- Released: February 20, 2019
- Genre: Pop
- Length: 2:58
- Label: RCA
- Songwriters: Alecia Moore; Scott Friedman; Nathaniel Ruess
- Producers: Peter Thomas; Kyle Moorman

Pink singles chronology
"A Million Dreams" (2018)	"Walk Me Home" (2019)	"Can We Pretend" (2019)

Music video
- "Walk Me Home" on YouTube

"Walk Me Home" is a song recorded by American singer Pink for her eighth studio album, Hurts 2B Human (2019). The track was announced during an interview on The Ellen DeGeneres Show broadcast on February 6, 2019, and it was released as the lead single from the album on February 20, 2019, by RCA Records. "Walk Me Home" was written by Pink, Scott Friedman, and Nate Ruess, while the production was handled by Peter Thomas and Kyle Moorman.

Upon its release, critical response was positive towards the track, with music critics commending the optimistic departure from Pink's previous singles. Commercially, "Walk Me Home" achieved moderate success and charted within the top-ten charts of several countries, including Croatia, Ireland, Latvia, Poland, Slovenia, Switzerland and the United Kingdom. In the United States, the single peaked at number 49 on the Billboard Hot 100, and reached number-one on the Adult Pop Songs chart, extending Pink's lead as the soloist with the most number-ones on the chart. For promotion, an accompanying lyric video was uploaded onto Pink's official YouTube channel simultaneously with the song's release, followed by the release of a music video directed by Michael Gracey on March 21, 2019. The singer performed "Walk Me Home" at the 2019 Brit Awards and on The Ellen DeGeneres Show.

== Background and release ==
Pink started to produce the song in 2018. Later on January 25, 2019, it was reported that Pink would receive a star on the Hollywood Walk of Fame; the ceremony was held on February 5, 2019, and she was joined by her two children and husband, Carey Hart. The following day, Pink appeared on The Ellen DeGeneres Show and stated that "Walk Me Home" would be released in two weeks, while the album, titled Hurts 2B Human, was believed to be released around April 2019. She also talked about shooting a music video with Michael Gracey, the director of The Greatest Showman, and the album's release. Pink sang a snippet of the song a cappella. A snippet of the track was released on social media, along with a release date announcement. "Walk Me Home" became available for digital download and streaming on February 20, 2019, and its lyric video was also released on YouTube the same day. It was serviced to hot adult contemporary radio and contemporary hit radio on February 25, 2019, and March 5, 2019, respectively.

== Composition ==
The song was written by Pink, Scott Friedman, and Nathaniel Ruess, while the production was handled by Peter Thomas and Kyle Moorman. Jon Blistein from Rolling Stone stated that the instrumentation of the track includes "heavy drums" and a "steady twang of an acoustic guitar." Aimee Cliff of The Guardian found "flourishes of digitised vocal production" and considered them "a fresh touch" in Pink's discography, consisting mainly of pop-rock" songs, while Mikael Wood of the Los Angeles Times felt that its structure contains "Lumineers-style stomp-folk" elements. According to the music sheet published at Musicnotes.com by Sony/ATV Music Publishing, "Walk Me Home" is performed in the key of D♭ major with a moderate tempo of 88 beats per minute. The song is composed in an irregular time signature that changes measure to measure, and Pink's vocals span from D♭_{3} to D♭_{5}.

== Critical reception ==
In the Chicago Sun-Times, Maeve McDermott wrote that the single is a "foot-stomping anthem" and marks an "optimistic departure" from Pink's previous singles that were centered around "dysfunctional" love. Mike Wass from Idolator described the sound as "a vocoder-laden Mumford-folk anthem" and said that the song's chorus is "big enough to swallow you whole". Amy O'Connor of Irish Times believed that the track is "admittedly catchy" and felt that it was "made to soundtrack the climax of an episode of Grey's Anatomy." In a review for Hurts 2B Human, Sarah Grant of Rolling Stone considered that "Walk Me Home" is a "jacked-up" sequel to "Just Give Me a Reason", while Toby Bryant from CelebMix called it a "fist-pumping" ballad. Sean Maunier from Metro Weekly called the track a "remarkable standout hit" and said that Pink succeeds to balance the "combination of swagger and vulnerability" with "a stomping, triumphant" song. Conversely, Stephen Thomas Erlewine from AllMusic felt that the record is "strident" and "a bit too insistent in its anthemic reach".

== Commercial performance ==
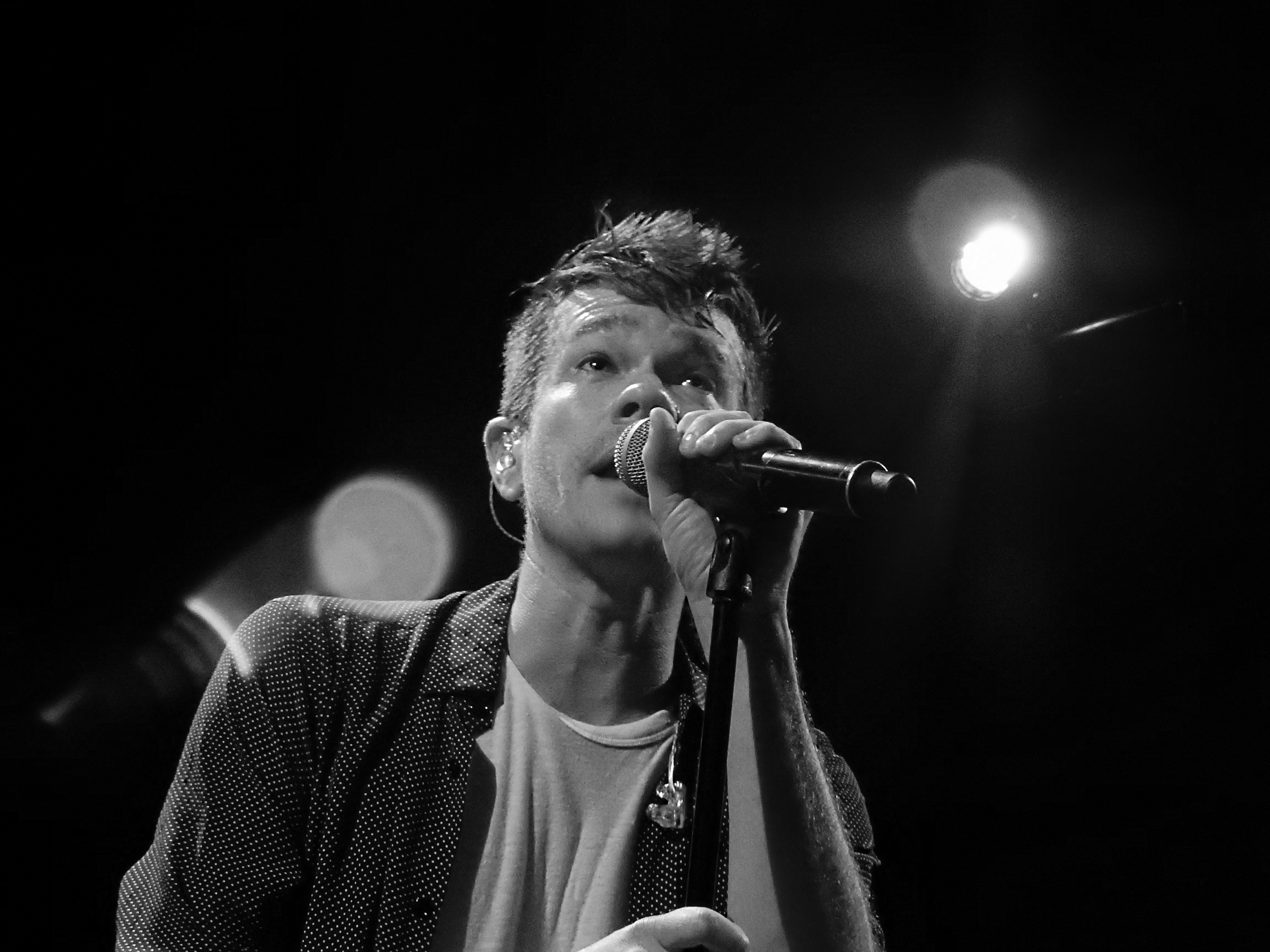
"Walk Me Home" was co-written by Nate Ruess, who previously collaborated with Pink on "Just Give Me a Reason".

In the United States, "Walk Me Home" entered at number 23 on the Billboard Digital Songs chart. The next week, the single ascended to its peak of number two, with 30,000 copies sold according to Nielsen SoundScan, and became her first song since "Setting The World On Fire" to reach this position, as well as her highest-charting single as a lead artist since "Just Give Me a Reason. Thereby, it debuted at number 54 on the Billboard Hot 100 on the week ending of March 9, 2019, becoming her 31st career entry. Following the release of Hurts 2B Human, "Walk Me Home" jumped 13 positions on the Hot 100, from number 62, and reached a new peak of number 49. On the other airplay charts monitored by Billboard, the song debuted at number 19 on the Adult Pop Songs chart. The next week, it jumped to number 14, becoming the week's greatest gainer. "Walk Me Home" ultimately reached number one on the week ending of June 15, 2019, becoming her tenth number-one single, as well as extending her record as the solo artist with the most number-ones on chart. On the Adult Contemporary chart, the song debuted at number 26 on the week ending of March 9, 2019, and was highest debut of the week. It reached at number eight—Pink's ninth top ten entry—for the issue dated June 29, 2019. On the week ending of September 14, 2019, it peaked at number-one, becoming her fifth chart-topping single, as well as her first song to do so since "What About Us". On the Canadian Hot 100, "Walk Me Home" debuted at number 79 on the chart, and reached a peak of number 18 in its second week.

In Australia, the song debuted at number 15 on the ARIA Singles Chart, before reaching number 11 four weeks later. "Walk Me Home" reached the top of the radio airplay charts, according to The Music Network. Australian Recording Industry Association (ARIA) awarded a double Platinum certification to the track for accumulating 140,000 equivalent sales units. The single debuted at number 37 in New Zealand, and peaked at number 26. The song entered the UK Singles Chart at number eight, becoming Pink's twentieth top-ten. Following the music video release, "Walk Me Home" re-entered the top ten, raising from number 12 to number nine and selling 27,350 copies according to the Official Charts Company. It also reached the top of the UK Airplay Charts, vaulting from number five to number one, thus becoming her fifth number-one single. It was certified 2× Platinum by the British Phonographic Industry (BPI) for selling over 1,200,000 units in the country. Elsewhere, "Walk Me Home" reached number six in Ireland, number nine in Netherlands, number two in Scotland, and number eight in Switzerland.

It was less successful in France, where the track peaked only at 167th spot from the French Singles Chart, becoming her lowest charting single there. It spent 6 weeks but has certified gold for 100.000 units sold. It reached however the top twenty in French Airplay, at number 14, becoming Pink's seventh top twenty airplay there.

== Live performances ==
After receiving the award for Outstanding Contribution to Music at the 2019 Brit Awards on the song's release date, Pink performed "Walk Me Home" in a medley. The performance started with Pink singing backstage in a robe, as she made her way from a dressing room to the stage. She switched to a red feather cloak before descending onto the stage as fire blasts spurted out from the platform.

Since its release, "Walk Me Home" has been included in the setlist of the 2019 leg of her Beautiful Trauma World Tour, replacing the track "I'm Not Dead". On April 22, 2019, she performed the song on The Ellen DeGeneres Show.

== Track listing ==
- Digital download
1. "Walk Me Home" – 2:58
- Remix single
1. "Walk Me Home" (R3hab remix) – 2:39
- Walk Me Home (The Remixes)
1. "Walk Me Home" (R3hab remix) – 2:39
2. "Walk Me Home" (R3hab extended mix) – 3:19
- Walk Me Home (The Remixes 2)
1. "Walk Me Home" (Until Dawn remix) – 2:38
2. "Walk Me Home" (Dinaire+Bissen remix) – 3:19

== Charts ==
=== Weekly charts ===
Chart (2019)	Peak position
Australia (ARIA)	11
Austria (Ö3 Austria Top 40)	36
Belgium (Ultratop 50 Flanders)	15
Belgium (Ultratop 50 Wallonia)	13
Canada Hot 100 (Billboard)	17
Canada AC (Billboard)	1
Canada CHR/Top 40 (Billboard)	32
Canada Hot AC (Billboard)	1
Croatia (HRT)	5
China Airplay/FL (Billboard)	10
Czech Republic Airplay (ČNS IFPI)	2
Czech Republic Singles Digital (ČNS IFPI)	37
Denmark Airplay (Tracklisten)	3
Denmark Digital Song Sales (Billboard)	2
Euro Digital Song Sales (Billboard)	3
Finland Airplay (Radiosoittolista)	10
France (SNEP)	167
France Airplay (SNEP)	14
Germany (GfK)	33
Greece (IFPI)	78
Hungary (Rádiós Top 40)	13
Hungary (Single Top 40)	14
Hungary (Stream Top 40)	33
Iceland (Tónlistinn)	6
Ireland (IRMA)	6
Italy (FIMI)	94
Lebanon (Lebanese Top 20)	11
Lithuania (AGATA)	30
Luxembourg Digital Songs (Billboard)	9
Mexico (Billboard Ingles Airplay)	19
Netherlands (Dutch Top 40)	7
Netherlands (Single Top 100)	18
New Zealand (Recorded Music NZ)	16
Norway (VG-lista)	33
Poland Airplay (ZPAV)	5
Romania (Airplay 100)	59
Scottish Singles Sales (Official Charts)	2
Slovakia Airplay (ČNS IFPI)	11
Slovakia Singles Digital (ČNS IFPI)	37
Slovenia (SloTop50)	6
Sweden (Sverigetopplistan)	35
Switzerland (Schweizer Hitparade)	8
UK Singles (Official Charts)	8
Ukraine Airplay (TopHit)	34
US Billboard Hot 100	49
US Adult Contemporary (Billboard)	1
US Adult Pop Airplay (Billboard)	1
US Dance Club Songs (Billboard)	1
US Pop Airplay (Billboard)	26

=== Year-end charts ===
Chart (2019)	Position
Australia (ARIA)	62
Belgium (Ultratop Flanders)	36
Belgium (Ultratop Wallonia)	44
Canada (Canadian Hot 100)	47
Hungary (Rádiós Top 100)	44
Iceland (Tónlistinn)	55
Ireland (IRMA)	43
Netherlands (Dutch Top 40)	27
Netherlands (Single Top 100)	65
Poland (ZPAV)	64
Slovenia (SloTop50)	22
Switzerland (Schweizer Hitparade)	69
UK Singles (Official Charts Company)	57
US Billboard Hot 100	99
US Adult Contemporary (Billboard)	5
US Adult Top 40 (Billboard)	5
US Dance Club Songs (Billboard)	22

Chart (2020)	Position
US Adult Contemporary (Billboard)	14

== Certifications ==
Region	Certification	Certified units/sales
Australia (ARIA)	4× Platinum	280,000^{‡}
Brazil (Pro-Música Brasil)	Platinum	40,000^{‡}
Canada (Music Canada)	3× Platinum	240,000^{‡}
Denmark (IFPI Danmark)	Platinum	90,000^{‡}
France (SNEP)	Gold	100,000^{‡}
Germany (BVMI)	Gold	200,000^{‡}
New Zealand (RMNZ)	2× Platinum	60,000^{‡}
Norway (IFPI Norway)	Gold	30,000^{‡}
Poland (ZPAV)	Platinum	20,000^{‡}
Switzerland (IFPI Switzerland)	Gold	10,000^{‡}
United Kingdom (BPI)	2× Platinum	1,200,000^{‡}
United States (RIAA)	Platinum	1,000,000^{‡}
Streaming
Sweden (GLF)	Gold	4,000,000^{†}
^{‡} Sales+streaming figures based on certification alone.^{†} Streaming-only figures based on certification alone.

== Release history ==
Region	Date	Format	Label	Ref.
Various	February 20, 2019	Digital download	RCA	
United States	February 25, 2019	Hot adult contemporary	RCA	
United States	March 5, 2019	Contemporary hit radio	RCA	
Various	April 8, 2019	Digital download – R3hab remix	RCA	

== See also ==
- List of Billboard number-one dance songs of 2019
- List of number-one adult contemporary singles of 2019 (U.S.)
- List of number-one digital tracks of 2019 (Australia)
- List of UK top-ten singles in 2019
