= Hurts 2B Human (song) =

2019 single by Pink featuring Khalid

Single by Pink featuring Khalid

from the album Hurts 2B Human
- Released: September 6, 2019
- Studio: Record Plant (Los Angeles)
- Length: 3:24
- Label: RCA
- Songwriters: Pink; Teddy Geiger; Scott Harris; Anna-Catherine Hartley; Alexander Izquierdo; Khalid Robinson
- Producer: Jorgen Odegard

Pink singles chronology
"Can We Pretend" (2019)	"Hurts 2B Human" (2019)	"Love Me Anyway" (2019)

Khalid singles chronology
"Right Back" (2019)	"Hurts 2B Human" (2019)	"Trigger" (2019)

Music video
- "Hurts 2B Human" on YouTube

"Hurts 2B Human" is a song by American singer Pink featuring Khalid for her eighth studio album of the same name (2019). The track was initially released on April 22 as the third and final promotional single but later sent to Italian radio aiprlay on September 6, 2019. The song was written alongside Teddy Geiger, Uffie, Eskeerdo, and Scott Harris, while the production was handled by Jorgen Odegard.

== Release ==
The official lyric video of "Hurts 2B Human" was released on April 22, 2019.

== Track listing ==
- Remixes
1. "Hurts 2B Human" (Midnight Kids remix) – 4:15
2. "Hurts 2B Human" (Kat Krazy remix) – 2:37
3. "Hurts 2B Human" (Alex Ghenea remix) – 3:09
4. "Hurts 2B Human" (FTampa remix) – 2:58
5. "Hurts 2B Human" (Frank Pole remix) – 3:10

== Charts ==
Chart (2019–2020)	Peak position
Australia (ARIA)	48
Canada Hot 100 (Billboard)	87
China Airplay/FL (Billboard)	36
France Downloads (SNEP)	173
Germany (Airplay Chart)	58
Ireland (IRMA)	55
Lithuania (AGATA)	92
Netherlands (Dutch Top 40)	28
New Zealand Hot Singles (RMNZ)	2
Scotland Singles (OCC)	53
Slovakia Airplay (ČNS IFPI)	15
Sweden Heatseaker (Sverigetopplistan)	4
Switzerland (Schweizer Hitparade)	59
UK Singles (OCC)	61
US Pop Digital Songs (Billboard)	19

== Certifications ==
Region	Certification	Certified units/sales
Australia (ARIA)	Platinum	70,000^{‡}
Brazil (Pro-Música Brasil)	Gold	20,000^{‡}
New Zealand (RMNZ)	Gold	15,000^{‡}
United Kingdom (BPI)	Silver	200,000^{‡}
^{‡} Sales+streaming figures based on certification alone.

== Release history ==
Region	Date	Format(s)	Label(s)	Ref.
Various	April 22, 2019	Digital download	RCA	
Italy	September 6, 2019	Sony Music	RCA	
