= Feel Good Time =

2003 single by Pink

Single by Pink featuring William Orbit

from the album Charlie's Angels: Full Throttle
- Released: May 27, 2003
- Studio: Guerilla Canyon, House of Blues (Los Angeles); Sarm West (London, England); The Enterprise (Burbank, California)
- Genre: Dance-punk; psychedelic rock; electronic rock
- Length: 3:56
- Label: Columbia
- Songwriters: William Orbit; Beck Hansen; Jay Ferguson
- Producer: William Orbit

Pink singles chronology
"Family Portrait" (2002)	"Feel Good Time" (2003)	"Trouble" (2003)

Charlie's Angels singles chronology
"Angel's Eye" (2000)	"Feel Good Time" (2003)	"Don't Call Me Angel" (2019)

Music video
- "Feel Good Time" on YouTube

"Feel Good Time" is a song by American singer Pink. It was written by Beck, Jay Ferguson, and William Orbit, who also produced the track as a featured artist. The song was released on May 27, 2003, as the lead single from the soundtrack of the 2003 film Charlie's Angels: Full Throttle, and it was later included on the international edition of Pink's third studio album, Try This. The single peaked at number 60 on the US Billboard Hot 100, reached number three on the UK Singles Chart, and was certified gold by the Australian Recording Industry Association (ARIA).

The song was originally written by and recorded by Beck and Orbit with the intention of being a Beck track, but after Pink wanted to cover the song, Beck gave the song to her. Beck's vocals and a guitar were removed and replaced with Pink's vocals. Beck's original was later posted on Orbit's website. "Feel Good Time" uses audio samples from "Fresh-Garbage" by Spirit.

"Feel Good Time" was nominated for the 2004 Grammy Award for Best Pop Collaboration with Vocals. Nancy and the Boys covered the song on the 2003 happy hardcore compilation album Speed SFX.

== Critical response ==
Stylus Magazine wrote a favorable review: "And then, there's the brilliance of 'Feel Good Time' – depending on whom you believe, either stolen from or written for by Beck – ostensibly/unofficially the first single from Try This. This 'association' with Beck serves as something of a touchstone for the album; forget for a moment the white-male-pain and subdued arrangements of Mutations and Sea Change and remember instead the schizoid pastiche spectaculars of Midnite Vultures. What the album occasionally lacks in coherence or narrative it more than makes up for in moments of pop brilliance, the kind of eccentric pop magic that's not been seen since the glory days of Cyndi Lauper (I'm sure it's no accident that P!nk looks alarmingly like The Unusual One in the liner photos)".

== Track listings ==
- UK CD single
1. "Feel Good Time" (single version) – 3:42
2. "Feel Good Time" (D-Bop's Full Throttle mix) – 7:58
3. "Feel Good Time" (Boris & Beck's Massive vocal) – 8:05
- UK cassette single
1. "Feel Good Time" (single version) – 3:42
2. "Feel Good Time" (Boris & Beck's Massive radio edit) – 3:51
- Australian CD single
1. "Feel Good Time" – 3:57
2. "Feel Good Time" (Boris & Beck's massive vocal) – 8:05
3. "Feel Good Time" (Boris & Beck's Feel Good dub) – 7:40
- European CD single
1. "Feel Good Time" – 3:42
2. "Feel Good Time" (D-Bop's Full Throttle mix) – 7:58
- German CD single
1. "Feel Good Time" – 3:42
2. "Feel Good Time" (D-Bop's Full Throttle mix) – 7:58
3. "Feel Good Time" (Boris & Beck's massive vocal) – 8:05
4. "Feel Good Time" (Boris & Beck's Feel Good dub) – 7:40

== Charts ==
=== Weekly charts ===
Chart (2003)	Peak position
Australia (ARIA)	7
Austria (Ö3 Austria Top 40)	9
Belgium (Ultratop 50 Flanders)	21
Belgium (Ultratop 50 Wallonia)	33
Croatia International Airplay (HRT)	4
Denmark (Tracklisten)	14
Europe (Eurochart Hot 100)	6
Finland (Suomen virallinen lista)	12
France (SNEP)	74
Germany (GfK)	16
Hungary (Single Top 40)	8
Ireland (IRMA)	9
Italy (FIMI)	18
Netherlands (Dutch Top 40)	13
Netherlands (Single Top 100)	18
New Zealand (Recorded Music NZ)	17
Norway (VG-lista)	6
Romania (Romanian Top 100)	78
Scottish Singles Sales (Official Charts)	2
Spain (Promusicae)	20
Sweden (Sverigetopplistan)	39
Switzerland (Schweizer Hitparade)	12
UK Singles (Official Charts)	3
US Billboard Hot 100	60
US Adult Pop Airplay (Billboard)	31
US Dance Club Songs (Billboard)	8
US Pop Airplay (Billboard)	15

=== Year-end charts ===
Chart (2003)	Position
Australia (ARIA)	98
Croatia International Airplay (HRT)	24
Ireland (IRMA)	84
Switzerland (Schweizer Hitparade)	76
UK Singles (OCC)	91
US Mainstream Top 40 (Billboard)	94

== Certifications and sales ==
Region	Certification	Certified units/sales
Australia (ARIA)	Gold	35,000^{^}
United States	—	1,000
^{^} Shipments figures based on certification alone.

== Release history ==
Release dates and formats for "Feel Good Time"
Region	Date	Format(s)	Label(s)	Ref.
United States	May 27, 2003	Contemporary hit radio	Columbia	
United States	June 16, 2003	Rhythmic contemporary radio	Columbia	
United Kingdom	July 7, 2003	CD; cassette	Columbia	
Australia	July 14, 2003	CD	Columbia	
