= Last to Know =

2004 single by Pink

Single by Pink

from the album Try This
- Released: April 13, 2004
- Studio: Steakhouse (North Hollywood, California); The Transplants' Bus
- Length: 4:03
- Label: LaFace; Arista
- Songwriters: Tim Armstrong; Pink
- Producer: Tim Armstrong

Pink singles chronology
"God Is a DJ" (2003)	"Last to Know" (2004)	"Stupid Girls" (2006)

Music video
- "Last to Know" on YouTube

"Last to Know" is a song by American recording artist Pink. It was written by her and producer Tim Armstrong for her third studio album Try This (2003). The track was released in some parts of Europe as a single in 2004, peaking just outside the top 20 in the Netherlands and the United Kingdom (her first single in the UK not to reach the top 20). In Austria and Switzerland, the single peaked inside the top fifty. In places such as Australia, the song was released to radio and digital download but never had a physical single release.

== Critical reception ==
The Guardian panned the song: "The Last to Know spends four minutes howling ferocious obscenities because someone has committed the unpardonable sin of turning down complimentary tickets to a Pink gig."

== Music video ==
The promotional music video for "Last to Know" consists of a montage of shots from some of Pink's concerts during her Try This Tour in Europe. The video, directed by Russell Thomas with footage of the concerts in the Netherlands and London shows Pink performing the song. Other moments from the concert are also shown.

== Track listings ==
- UK CD single
1. "Last to Know" – 4:30
2. "Last to Know" (D Bop's Club Edit) – 5:30
- European CD single
1. "Last to Know"
2. "God Is a DJ" (Robbie Rivera Main Vocal Mix)
3. "God Is a DJ" (Robbie Rivera Juicy After Hour Dub)
4. "God Is a DJ" (Hyper Remix)
5. "Last to Know" (Music Video)

== Charts ==
Weekly chart performance for "Last to Know"
Chart (2004)	Peak position
Austria (Ö3 Austria Top 40)	48
Belgium (Ultratip Bubbling Under Flanders)	3
Belgium (Ultratip Bubbling Under Wallonia)	12
CIS Airplay (TopHit)	147
Croatia International Airplay (HRT)	2
Germany (GfK)	66
Hungary (Single Top 40)	10
Ireland (IRMA)	23
Netherlands (Dutch Top 40)	22
Netherlands (Single Top 100)	40
Russia Airplay (TopHit)	112
Scotland Singles (OCC)	17
Switzerland (Schweizer Hitparade)	46
UK Singles (OCC)	21
Ukraine Airplay (TopHit)	142

== Release history ==
Release dates and formats for "Last to Know"
Region	Date	Format(s)	Label(s)	Ref.
Denmark	April 13, 2004	CD	Arista; BMG	
Germany	April 13, 2004	CD	Sony BMG	
United Kingdom	April 19, 2004	CD	RCA	
