= Can We Pretend =

2019 single by Pink

Single by Pink featuring Cash Cash

from the album Hurts 2B Human
- Released: June 21, 2019
- Recorded: 2018–19
- Studio: The Village (Los Angeles, California)
- Genre: Dance-pop; dance; EDM
- Length: 3:40
- Label: RCA
- Songwriters: Alecia Moore; Ryan Tedder; Jean Paul Makhlouf; Alex Makhlouf; Samuel Frisch
- Producers: Cash Cash; Ryan Tedder

Pink singles chronology
"Walk Me Home" (2019)	"Can We Pretend" (2019)	"Hurts 2B Human" (2019)

Cash Cash singles chronology
"Call You" (2018)	"Can We Pretend" (2019)	"Mean It" (2020)

Music video
- "Can We Pretend" on YouTube

"Can We Pretend" is a song recorded by American singer Pink for her eighth studio album, Hurts 2B Human (2019). The track was initially released as the second promotional single on April 11, 2019, but later sent to radio on June 21, 2019, as the album's second single. It was the most added single to radio in Australia a month prior.

"Can We Pretend" was written by Pink, Ryan Tedder, Jean Paul Makhlouf, Alex Makhlouf, Samuel Frisch, while the production was handled by American DJ trio Cash Cash and OneRepublic frontman Ryan Tedder.

== Release ==
The official lyric video of "Can We Pretend" was released on April 11, 2019. An animated music video directed and drawn by JonJon was released on June 28, 2019. On the same day an official remix by Sigala was released.

== Live performances ==
Since its release, "Can We Pretend" has been included in the setlist of the 2019 leg of her Beautiful Trauma World Tour.

== Track listing ==
Remix single

- "Can We Pretend" (Sigala Remix) – 3:05

Can We Pretend (The Remixes) [Featuring Cash Cash]

1. "Can We Pretend" (MOTi Remix) – 2:57
2. "Can We Pretend" (Hook n Sling Remix) – 3:10
3. "Can We Pretend" (Yves V Remix) – 2:33
4. "Can We Pretend" (Bart B More Remix) – 4:09

== Charts ==
=== Weekly charts ===
Weekly chart performance
Chart (2019–2020)	Peak position
Australia (ARIA)	99
Belgium (Ultratop 50 Flanders)	25
Belgium (Ultratop 50 Wallonia)	48
Canada Hot 100 (Billboard)	99
Canada AC (Billboard)	11
Canada Hot AC (Billboard)	11
China Airplay/FL (Billboard)	39
CIS Airplay (TopHit)	140
Croatia (HRT)	41
Czech Republic Airplay (ČNS IFPI)	33
France Airplay (SNEP)	3
France Downloads (SNEP)	64
Germany (Airplay Chart)	4
Hungary (Rádiós Top 40)	12
Iceland (Tónlistinn)	22
Ireland (IRMA)	84
Netherlands (Tipparade)	14
New Zealand Hot Singles (RMNZ)	14
Scotland Singles (OCC)	30
Slovakia Airplay (ČNS IFPI)	6
Slovenia (SloTop50)	9
Sweden Heatseaker (Sverigetopplistan)	1
Switzerland (Schweizer Hitparade)	76
UK Singles (OCC)	88
Ukraine Airplay (TopHit)	49
US Adult Pop Airplay (Billboard)	9
US Adult Contemporary (Billboard)	28
US Dance/Mix Show Airplay (Billboard)	21
US Dance Club Songs (Billboard)	1
US Digital Song Sales (Billboard)	31
US Pop Digital Songs (Billboard)	9

=== Year-end charts ===
Annual chart rankings
Chart (2019)	Position
Belgium (Ultratop Flanders)	92
Iceland (Tónlistinn)	98
US Adult Top 40 (Billboard)	34
US Dance Club Songs (Billboard)	49

== Certifications ==
Certifications and sales
Region	Certification	Certified units/sales
Australia (ARIA)	Platinum	70,000^{‡}
Brazil (Pro-Música Brasil)	Gold	20,000^{‡}
Canada (Music Canada)	Gold	40,000^{‡}
New Zealand (RMNZ)	Gold	15,000^{‡}
United Kingdom (BPI)	Silver	200,000^{‡}
^{‡} Sales+streaming figures based on certification alone.

== Release history ==
Street dates
Region	Date	Format(s)	Version	Label(s)	Ref.
Various	April 11, 2019 (Note: Release as a promotional single.)	Digital download; streaming	Original	RCA	
Italy	June 21, 2019	Radio airplay	Original	RCA	
Various	June 28, 2019	Digital download; streaming	Sigala remix	RCA	
Various	July 12, 2019	Digital download; streaming	Remixes	RCA	
United States	July 22, 2019	Adult contemporary radio; hot adult contemporary radio; modern adult contemporary radio	Original	RCA	

== See also ==
- List of Billboard number-one dance songs of 2019
