= Trouble (Pink song) =

2003 single by Pink

Single by Pink

from the album Try This
- B-side: "Delirium"; "Free"
- Released: September 29, 2003
- Studio: Steakhouse (North Hollywood, California); The Transplants' Bus; Mansfield Lodge (Hollywood, California); Crackertracks (Los Angeles)
- Genre: Punk rock; hard rock
- Length: 3:12
- Label: LaFace; Arista
- Songwriters: Pink; Tim Armstrong
- Producer: Tim Armstrong

Pink singles chronology
| "Feel Good Time" (2003) | "Trouble" (2003) | "God Is a DJ" (2003) |

Music video
- "Trouble" on YouTube

"Trouble" is a song by American singer Pink for her third studio album, Try This (2003). Initially written by Tim Armstrong for his band Rancid, the song was re-written with Pink after it was brought to her attention. Produced by Armstrong, "Trouble" is a pop friendly punk-rock tune, that features a gritty and choppy guitar riff, with Pink describing it as a "fun song." Lyrically, it has the singer playing up on her bad-girl image, with her persona and anger promising unrest in her city.

The song was released by Arista Records as the album's lead single on September 29, 2003. It earned largely positive reviews from music critics who ranked it among the standout tracks on its parent album, though some called the song "repetitive." Commercially, it became a top-10 hit in several countries, reaching the top five in Austria, Canada, Croatia, Norway, and Switzerland. In the United States, "Trouble" underperformed, peaking at number 68 on the Billboard Hot 100 chart.

Sophie Muller was consulted to film a music video for the song, which is set on a ranch and features appearances from the Pussycat Dolls and actor Jeremy Renner. In 2004, "Trouble" earned Pink her first (and as of 2026 only) Grammy Award for her solo work when it won Best Female Rock Vocal Performance. A subsequent cover by Shakin' Stevens was also commercially successful in the United Kingdom, peaking at number 20 in 2005. In 2012, Armstrong would finally record the song himself under the name Tim Timebomb.

== Background ==
"Trouble" was written by Pink and musician Tim Armstrong. Armstrong had originally written the song for his own band Rancid's 2003 album, Indestructible; however, the song failed to make the final cut, so when asked to work with Pink after she had toured with his side project, the Transplants, he brought the song to her attention, and it was partially re-written with her. The pair wrote ten songs together in two weeks, with nine of them ending up on the album. Armstrong told MTV News of their sessions: "We could just sit down and my voice would be all fucked up, and she would sing like an angel. She can stack, like, five harmonies real quick. She's a very talented singer and a very talented lyricist." Pink further elaborated on the nature of the song in MTV's Making the Video: "It's not like a high-concept song, "Trouble," it's just a fun song and it's about attitude."

== Critical reception ==
"Trouble" has received positive reviews from critics. AllMusic highlighted the song and noted that the similarities of "Trouble" and Nirvana's cover of The Vaselines' "Molly's Lips" may be on purpose. David Browne of Entertainment Weekly complimented: "Fans of Pink's earlier records may not be thrilled — in fact, the punk-lite first single, "Trouble," is running into trouble of its own on the pop charts — but one has to admire Pink's musical fearlessness, equal in its way to Justin Timberlake's." The Guardian wasn't that positive at all: "[The song] blusters crossly, without ever revealing what the matter is, a state of affairs not helped by its clumsy phraseology. 'If you see me coming down the street,' she snarls, 'you know it's time to go' — well, you said it." Rolling Stone wasn't either: "Pink seems to be on autopilot through the first few tracks of Try This; she swaggers her way through insubstantial, predictable rants about going out on the town and battling emotionally challenged losers. 'I'm trouble, yeah, trouble now/I'm trouble, y'all, I disturb my town,' she brags in "Trouble"." Sal Cinquemani of Slant Magazine wrote: "The stiff-wristed herky-jerky first chords of the album's opening song (and lead single), "Trouble," pointedly announce Pink's new punk-rock sound. The repetitive hook of the raucous "Trouble," one of 10 new tracks co-written and produced by Rancid's Tim Armstrong, wears a bit thin but there's no denying its infectious b-section."

Stylus Magazine was favorable: "Try This opens with "Trouble," the first of eight tracks on the album co-helmed by Rancid's Tim Armstrong. Pink and Armstrong cram as many ideas as possible into "Trouble," from an Any Trouble (ha!) guitar solo to a Huey Lewis and the News-esque brass-laden breakdown, Hammond organ, layered vocals [...] whatwhatwhat?" Nick Catucci of The Village Voice was proud, too: "Album opener and settled-upon single "Trouble" isolates Rancid's primary strains: spare, beat-propelled verse poised for a declarative, kick-guitar chorus; that warm organ; a simple, squealing solo; wistful, throaty bridge to furious finale. Vacillating subtly between soulful and snotty, Pink's voice speaks more to her conflicts as an artist than as the daughter and girlfriend who stomped through Missundaztood." Yahoo! Music Canada was favorable: "Raw guitars mesh effortlessly with dance beats on middle-finger waving anthems like 'Trouble' and they noted that this song is miles ahead of the "likeminded efforts on Pink's mixed-up Missundaztood, and further benefit from Armstrong's scruffy but generally unerring pop sense." The A.V. Club was positive: "On "Trouble," the first single, she builds back-off sentiment from tired declaration to giddy decree, touching on a vocal range spread over the album to great effect. Sliding from yearning growl to grainy yowl and hitting all points between, Pink's voice is an expressive, embattled marvel. And she needs it to navigate Try This' jarring tonal shifts."

== Commercial performance ==
"Trouble" was released by Arista Records as the album's lead single on September 29, 2003. It became a top ten hit on most of the charts in appeared on, particularly throughout Europe, where it reached the top five in Austria, Croatia, Norway, and Switzerland. In the United States, "Trouble" failed to catch on at radio and missed to crack the upper half of the US Billboard Hot 100. In a 2003 interview with The Ledger, Pink elaborated on the success of the song in the US: "I don't judge myself on how well my songs do at radio, or how much my album sells. A failure and a success is all how you look at it. I've been creative to my highest potential at this point of my life, and I'm super-proud of myself for making it this far.

== Music video ==
The song's music video is western-themed. It was directed by Sophie Muller and filmed in early September on a ranch in Newhall, California, where the television show Little House on the Prairie had been shot. The video opens with Pink galloping with speed through a forested area while checking over her shoulder indicating that she is possibly being pursued. She rides her horse until she pauses at the edge of a small town (population 96) which is called Sharktown. The town is depicted as a dull place and even a tumbleweed blowing down the street is seen. Pink looks to her right and sees a flag with three black stars which pays homage to the flag of Tennessee and indicates that events depicted in the video are likely to have occurred prior to the turn of the 20th century. She then looks down and sees a crude grave marker which bears the name 'Corky'. She checks her makeup briefly in a small compact and proceeds to ride deeper into the town.

There is a wide establishing shot of Pink as she moves through the main street. Local residents survey her from the shadows and treat her with mistrust and suspicion. An old woman in rags blesses herself while others, including a young girl and a dirty-looking man stare at the stranger open-mouthed. A quick zooming shot indicates that she is being watched by a character in a black shirt wearing eyeliner, who is later revealed as the sheriff. She sees several horses tied up and immediately notices that there appears to be an element of animal cruelty in the manner in which the horses are being cared for. Upon inspecting the ankles of the horses there appears to be ligature marks and Pink, believing that more could be done in relation to the welfare of the animals begins a brawl with the men nearby. She is the victor of the short fight and disperses with her opponents in a variety of ways such as tossing them into water troughs or slamming their face off the side of the wooden buildings. The sheriff is obviously nervous of the impact that this new character is having on the town and spits in disdain.

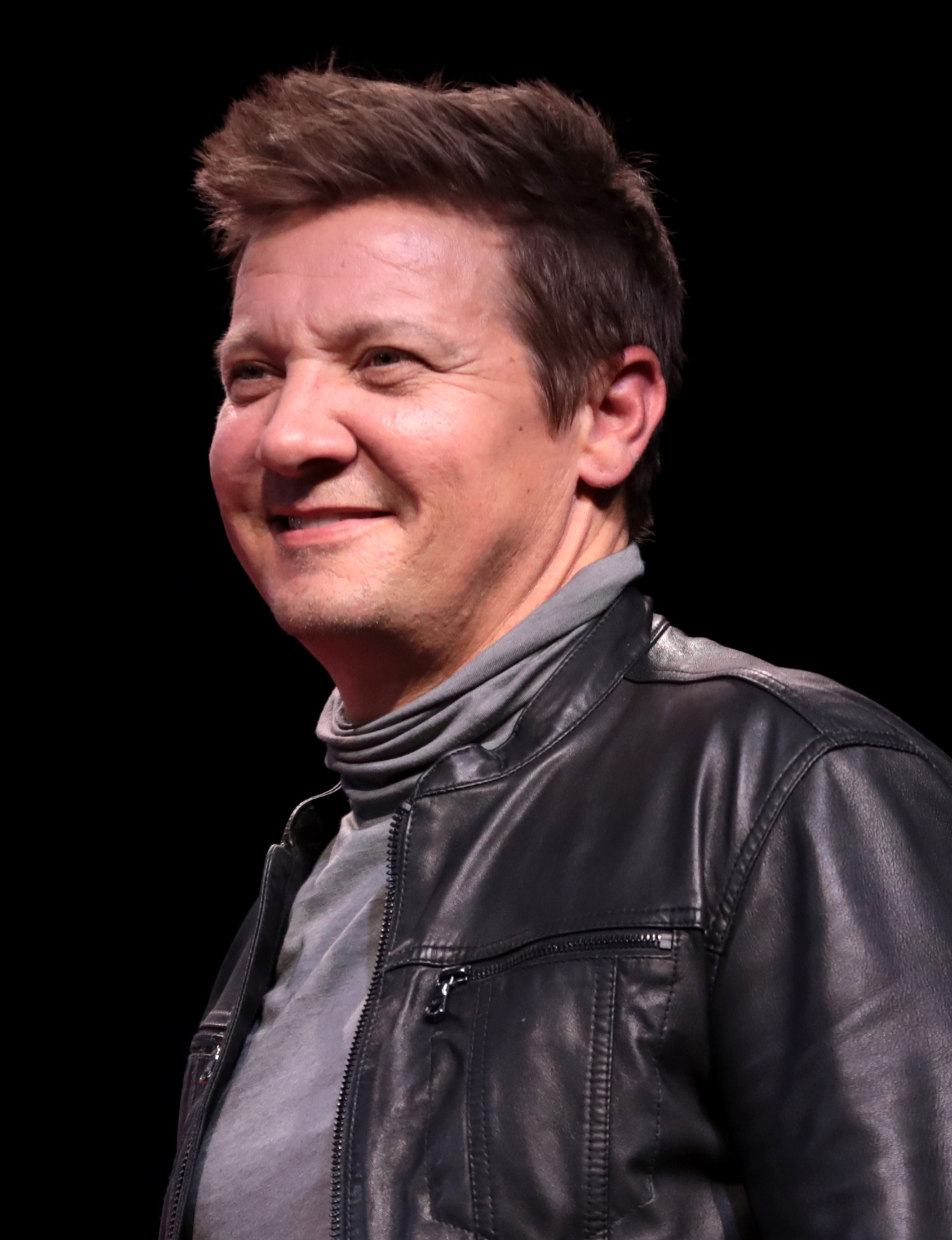
Actor Jeremy Renner appears as a sheriff in the music video for "Trouble."

She then enters a saloon and pushing two existing customers that are already standing at the bar aside she attempts to order a drink. The bartender looks to the sheriff (Jeremy Renner), who has been watching Pink since she arrived for confirmation before he prepares the beverage. When the sheriff indicates "no", and the bartender refuses to serve Pink she falls into a blind rage and grabs the bartender by the scruff of the neck, and screams in his face before leaping over the counter and tossing him into the public area of the saloon. These actions become the catalyst for an ever bigger brawl and though attacked by many of the patrons Pink continues to fight on though furniture is being destroyed and presumably severe injuries are being experienced by many occupants. The fight simmers down very quickly though and while Pink is taking a moment to relax and sing on the bar's piano the sheriff decides to take an opportunity to subdue her and smashes a bottle on her head and she is carried, despite her struggles, to a cell in the sheriff's office.

Pink seduces the sheriff, even though she kicked him in the face while she was being incarcerated, it appears that the physical contact has got his attention and he is sexually attracted to her. He lets her out of the cell and while they are playfully engaging in light foreplay with each other the handcuffs are transferred from her wrists to restraining the sheriff to the window bars of his own office. She escapes custody and immediately heads back to the bar for another fight. As the sheriff struggles against his shackles Pink and several other women (specifically, the Pussycat Dolls) begin a style of burlesque dancing on top of the bar counter. She runs frantically from room to room and gets the attention of various ladies who it is insinuated are prostitutes and are being affectionate to the clientele. The ladies join the rebellion against the male oppression and one by one the men are defeated until a showdown situation arises where Pink and the sheriff face each other in a whip fight on the middle of the broad main street. The sheriff loses and succumbs to the women of the town who surround him immediately. She removes the town's flag and waves it above her head. A shot of two locals with the cloth symbol of oppression in their hands are seen just before Pink gallops jubilantly out of the town.

The child actress, Kelsey Lewis, who is featured in the video, also stars in Pink's video for "Family Portrait".

== Track listings ==
UK CD single
| No. | Title | Writer(s) | Producer(s) | Length |
|---|---|---|---|---|
| 1. | "Trouble" (radio edit) | Pink; Tim Armstrong | Armstrong | 3:12 |
| 2. | "Delirium" | Pink; Linda Perry | Perry | 3:40 |
| 3. | "Free" | Pink; Perry; Eric Schermerhorn; Paul Ill; Brian MacLeod | Perry | 6:38 |
| 4. | "Trouble" (video) | | | 3:57 |

European CD single and cassette
| No. | Title | Writer(s) | Producer(s) | Length |
|---|---|---|---|---|
| 1. | "Trouble" (album version) | Pink; Armstrong | Armstrong | 3:12 |
| 2. | "Delirium" | Pink; Perry | Perry | 3:40 |

US CD single
| No. | Title | Writer(s) | Producer(s) | Length |
|---|---|---|---|---|
| 1. | "Trouble" (album version) | Pink; Armstrong | Armstrong | 3:12 |
| 2. | "Trouble" (Hyper Radio remix) | Pink; Armstrong | Armstrong; DJ Hyper^{[a]}; Ronnie^{[a]} | 3:50 |

Notes

- ^{^[a]} signifies an additional producer(s)

== Personnel ==
Personnel are lifted from the liner notes of Try This.

- Tim Armstrong – writing, production, recording
- Atticus Ross – additional engineering
- Dave Carlock – recording
- Tony Cooper – engineering assistance
- John Silas Cranfield – engineering assistance
- John Fields – additional production
- Femio Hernandez – engineering assistance
- Tom Lord-Alge – mixing
- Pink – writing (as Alecia Moore), vocals, background vocals
- Fredrik Sarhagen – engineering assistance

== Charts ==
=== Weekly charts ===
Weekly chart performance for "Trouble"
| Chart (2003) | Peak position |
|---|---|
| Australia (ARIA) | 8 |
| Austria (Ö3 Austria Top 40) | 5 |
| Belgium (Ultratop 50 Flanders) | 32 |
| Belgium (Ultratip Bubbling Under Wallonia) | 1 |
| Canada (Nielsen SoundScan) | 2 |
| Croatia International Airplay (HRT) | 5 |
| Denmark (Tracklisten) | 8 |
| Europe (Eurochart Hot 100) | 8 |
| Germany (GfK) | 7 |
| Greece (IFPI) | 26 |
| Hungary (Editors' Choice Top 40) | 10 |
| Ireland (IRMA) | 7 |
| Italy (FIMI) | 11 |
| Netherlands (Dutch Top 40) | 10 |
| Netherlands (Single Top 100) | 22 |
| New Zealand (Recorded Music NZ) | 20 |
| Norway (VG-lista) | 5 |
| Romania (Romanian Top 100) | 80 |
| Scottish Singles Sales (Official Charts) | 6 |
| Sweden (Sverigetopplistan) | 8 |
| Switzerland (Schweizer Hitparade) | 5 |
| UK Singles (Official Charts) | 7 |
| US Billboard Hot 100 | 68 |
| US Pop Airplay (Billboard) | 16 |

=== Year-end charts ===
2003 year-end chart performance for "Trouble"
| Chart (2003) | Position |
|---|---|
| Australia (ARIA) | 93 |
| Austria (Ö3 Austria Top 40) | 57 |
| Croatia International Airplay (HRT) | 66 |
| Ireland (IRMA) | 62 |
| Netherlands (Dutch Top 40) | 81 |
| Sweden (Hitlistan) | 63 |
| Switzerland (Schweizer Hitparade) | 68 |
| UK Singles (OCC) | 110 |

2004 year-end chart performance for "Trouble"
| Chart (2004) | Position |
|---|---|
| Austria (Ö3 Austria Top 40) | 40 |

== Certifications and sales ==
Certifications and sales for "Trouble"
| Region | Certification | Certified units/sales |
|---|---|---|
| Australia (ARIA) | Platinum | 70,000^{‡} |
| Norway (IFPI Norway) | Gold | 5,000^{*} |
| United Kingdom (BPI) | Silver | 200,000^{‡} |
| United States | — | 233,000 |
^{*} Sales figures based on certification alone.^{‡} Sales+streaming figures based on certification alone.

== Release history ==
Release dates and formats for "Trouble"
| Region | Date | Format(s) | Label(s) | Ref. |
|---|---|---|---|---|
| United States | September 29, 2003 | Contemporary hit radio | Arista | |
| Australia | October 23, 2003 | Digital download | BMG | |
| Australia | October 27, 2003 | CD | BMG | |
| Germany | October 27, 2003 | CD | BMG | |
| United Kingdom | October 27, 2003 | 7-inch vinyl; cassette; CD | RCA | |
| Sweden | October 31, 2003 | CD | Arista | |
| United States | November 4, 2003 | 12-inch vinyl | Arista | |
| United States | December 16, 2003 | CD | Arista | |
