= God Is a DJ (Pink song) =

2003 single by Pink

- Worldwide cover; UK CD2 uses a closeup of the same picture as cover

Single by P!nk

from the album Try This
- B-side: "Trouble"
- Released: November 17, 2003
- Studio: Turtle Sound (New York City); Steakhouse (North Hollywood, California)
- Genre: Dance-rock
- Length: 3:43
- Label: LaFace; Arista
- Songwriters: Pink; Jonnie "Most" Davis; Billy Mann
- Producers: Billy Mann; Jonnie "Most" Davis

P!nk singles chronology
| "Trouble" (2003) | "God Is a DJ" (2003) | "Last to Know" (2004) |

Audio sample
- file; help

Music video
- "God is a DJ" on YouTube

"God Is a DJ" is a song by American singer P!nk from her third album, Try This (2003). It was released as the album's second single on November 17, 2003. It is about letting go, loving life and living it to the fullest. It peaked at number six on the Dutch Top 40 and number 11 on the UK Singles Chart. The song appears on the soundtrack of the 2004 film Mean Girls.

== Background ==
"God Is a DJ" was written by Pink along with Jonnie "Most" Davis and Billy Mann. The song marked Pink's first collaboration with Mann who would become a frequent collaborator on subsequent projects. In 2017, Mann elaborated on their work on Try This: "I had the hook of "God Is a DJ" in my head, which felt perfect for [Pink]. We met at noon in LA and within 15 minutes, we were drinking whiskey, smoking and it was all Philly. We finished "God Is a DJ’" together and it began. That was 15 years ago.”

== Critical response ==
AllMusic praised the song and noted it as one of the best songs on the Try This album. Entertainment Weekly was negative however, calling it cheesy. Rolling Stone also panned the song, criticizing it for reusing earlier messages, especially from the lead single "Trouble". Slant Magazine was positive, however, comparing the single to music from Madonna and wondering why it was not chosen as the lead. Stylus Magazine panned the single, calling it an unsuccessful attempt to recapture Pink's earlier music. The Village Voice critically praised "God Is a DJ", also questioning why it was not chosen as the lead single. Yahoo! Music also gave the song a favorable review, calling it a "piece of punky disco perfection."

== Music video ==
A music video for "God Is a DJ" was directed by Jake Scott. It features scenes of Pink and others (assumed to be her roommates) getting dressed, having fun on a subway, and going to a nightclub. Pink then continues to bribe the bouncer – dressed in eccentric drag clothing – to enter the nightclub ahead of the queue. The video debuted on MTV's Total Request Live at number ten on January 22, 2004, and peaked at number six.

== Track listings ==
UK CD1

1. "God Is a DJ" – 3:43
2. "Trouble" (Hyper remix edit) – 3:50

UK CD2

1. "God Is a DJ" – 3:43
2. "Trouble" (acoustic version) – 3:01
3. "God Is a DJ" (D-Bop vocal remix) – 6:36
4. "God Is a DJ" (music video) – 3:59

European CD1

1. "God Is a DJ" – 3:43
2. "Trouble" (acoustic version) – 3:01

European CD2

1. "God Is a DJ" – 3:43
2. "Trouble" (acoustic version) – 3:01
3. "God Is a DJ" (D-Bop vocal remix) – 6:36
4. "God Is a DJ" (Spider remix)
5. "God Is a DJ" (music video) – 3:59

Australian CD

1. "God Is a DJ" – 3:43
2. "Trouble" (acoustic version) – 3:01
3. "God Is a DJ" (D-Bop vocal remix) – 6:36
4. "God Is a DJ" (Spider remix)

iTunes EP

1. "God Is a DJ" (Spider dub)
2. "God Is a DJ" (D-Bop remix)
3. "God Is a DJ" (Spider remix)
4. "God Is a DJ" (Electroheadz remix)

== Personnel ==
Personnel are lifted from the liner notes of Try This.

- John Silas Cranfield – arrangement, engineering, production, writing
- Jonnie "Most" Davis – arrangement, engineering, production, writing
- John Fields – additional drums, piano
- Jay Goin – assistant engineering
- Billy Mann – arrangement, backing vocals, production, writing
- Pink – vocals, writing
- Chris Testa – assistant engineering

== Charts ==
=== Weekly charts ===
Weekly chart performance for "God Is a DJ"
| Chart (2003–2004) | Peak position |
|---|---|
| Australia (ARIA) | 24 |
| Austria (Ö3 Austria Top 40) | 26 |
| Belgium (Ultratop 50 Flanders) | 40 |
| Belgium (Ultratip Bubbling Under Wallonia) | 8 |
| CIS Airplay (TopHit) | 138 |
| CIS Airplay (TopHit) Spider remix | 45 |
| Croatia International Airplay (HRT) | 4 |
| Denmark (Tracklisten) | 16 |
| Germany (GfK) | 44 |
| Hungary (Editors' Choice Top 40) | 6 |
| Ireland (IRMA) | 13 |
| Italy (FIMI) | 42 |
| Netherlands (Dutch Top 40) | 6 |
| Netherlands (Single Top 100) | 32 |
| New Zealand (Recorded Music NZ) | 30 |
| Norway (VG-lista) | 20 |
| Russia Airplay (TopHit) | 133 |
| Russia Airplay (TopHit) Spider remix | 159 |
| Scottish Singles Sales (Official Charts) | 9 |
| Sweden (Sverigetopplistan) | 49 |
| Switzerland (Schweizer Hitparade) | 32 |
| UK Singles (Official Charts) | 11 |
| Ukraine Airplay (TopHit) | 105 |
| Ukraine Airplay (TopHit) Spider remix | 15 |
| US Bubbling Under Hot 100 (Billboard) | 3 |
| US Dance Club Songs (Billboard) | 17 |
| US Pop Airplay (Billboard) | 26 |

=== Year-end charts ===
Year-end chart performance for "God Is a DJ"
| Chart (2004) | Position |
|---|---|
| Croatia International Airplay (HRT) | 53 |
| Netherlands (Dutch Top 40) | 85 |
| Ukraine Airplay (TopHit) Spider remix | 192 |

== Certifications ==
Certifications for "God Is a DJ"
| Region | Certification | Certified units/sales |
|---|---|---|
| Australia (ARIA) | Gold | 35,000^{‡} |
^{‡} Sales+streaming figures based on certification alone.

== Release history ==
Release dates and formats for "God Is a DJ"
| Region | Date | Format(s) | Label | Ref. |
|---|---|---|---|---|
| United States | November 17, 2003 | Contemporary hit radio | Arista | |
| Various | December 25, 2003 | Digital download (EP) | Arista | |
| Australia | January 26, 2004 | CD | Arista | |
| United Kingdom | January 26, 2004 | 12-inch vinyl; CD; maxi-CD | RCA | |
| Denmark | February 16, 2004 | Maxi-CD | Arista; BMG | |
| Germany | February 16, 2004 | CD; maxi-CD | BMG | |
| Sweden | February 18, 2004 | Maxi-CD | Arista | |
