= Trust Fall (disambiguation) =

A trust fall is an activity in which a person deliberately falls, trusting the members of a group to catch them.

Trust Fall may also refer to:

- Trust Fall (Side A), a 2015 extended play by Incubus
- Trust Fall (Side B), a 2020 extended play by Incubus
- "Trust Fall", a 2021 song by Bebe Rexha from Better Mistakes
- Trustfall, a 2023 album by Pink
  - "Trustfall" (song), the title song
  - Trustfall Tour, the supporting concert tour
- "Trust Fall" (Lanterns), a television series episode
