= Trustfall Tour =

2023–2024 concert tour by Pink

- Tour by Pink
- Promotional poster for the tour
- Location: North America
- Associated album: Trustfall
- Start date: October 12, 2023
- End date: November 20, 2024
- No. of shows: 34
- Supporting acts: Sheryl Crow; Grouplove; KidCutUp; The Script
- Box office: US$109.1 million (as of November 2024)

Pink concert chronology
- Summer Carnival (2023–2024); Trustfall Tour (2023–2024); Live at Sphere (2027)

The Trustfall Tour was the ninth concert tour by American singer Pink, in support of her ninth studio album Trustfall (2023). It began on October 12, 2023, at Golden 1 Center in Sacramento, California, and concluded on November 20, 2024, at Colonial Life Arena in Columbia, South Carolina.

== Background ==
On February 17, 2023, Pink announced she would be embarking on a 14-city North American arena tour, following the end of her Summer Carnival stadium tour. Additional concerts were subsequently added, due to high demand. On February 27 of the same year, an additional concert in Sunrise, Florida at the Amerant Bank Arena was added. On October 12, 2023, a concert in Tulsa, Oklahoma was announced. The following month, the concert was again postponed. In December 2023, the five previously postponed dates were scheduled, with opening acts Sheryl Crow, KidCutUp and The Script. On January 22, 2024, eight additional dates — dubbed "Pink Live" — were added for October and November of the same year. Six further shows were added to the tour on February 26, 2024. On March 25, a show in Des Moines, Iowa was added. On October 19, 2024, she announced four concerts were postponed due to "reasons beyond my control", while citing the dates would be rescheduled "as soon as we can". The concerts were canceled the following month.

In collaboration with PEN America, the singer distributed 2,000 free copies of banned books to her fans in Miami and Sunrise, Florida.

== Commercial performance ==
On November 27, 2023, Billboard reported the singer sold 81,100 tickets over the first six shows of the tour, bringing in $20.2 million. In an August 2024 report, Billboard reported the tour had grossed $60.8 million and sold 257,000 tickets as of July of the same year. In November 2024, Billboard reported a total gross of $109.1 million.

== Set list ==
This set list is from the October 14, 2023, concert in San Francisco. It may not represent all concerts for the tour.

1. "Get the Party Started"
2. "Raise Your Glass"
3. "Who Knew"
4. "Just Like a Pill"
5. "Try"
6. "What About Us"
7. "Turbulence"
8. "Make You Feel My Love"
9. "Just Give Me a Reason"
10. "Fuckin' Perfect"
11. "Just Like Fire" / "Heartbreaker"
12. "Please Don't Leave Me"
13. "Cover Me in Sunshine"
14. "Don't Let Me Get Me"
15. "When I Get There"
16. "Me and Bobby McGee"
17. "I Am Here"
18. "Irrelevant"
19. "No Ordinary Love"
20. "Trustfall"
21. "Blow Me (One Last Kiss)"
22. "Never Gonna Not Dance Again"
23. "So What"

=== Additional notes ===
- During the October 14 and November 12, 2023, concerts, "Cover Me in Sunshine" was performed with Pink's daughter Willow Sage Hart.

== Shows ==
List of 2023 concerts
Date (2023)	City	Country	Venue	Opening acts	Attendance	Revenue
October 12	Sacramento	United States	Golden 1 Center	Grouplove; KidCutUp	—	—
October 14	San Francisco	United States	Chase Center	Grouplove; KidCutUp	25,500	$6,800,000
October 15	San Francisco	United States	Chase Center	Grouplove; KidCutUp	25,500	$6,800,000
October 25	Denver	United States	Ball Arena	Grouplove; KidCutUp	—	—
October 27	Kansas City	United States	T-Mobile Center	Grouplove; KidCutUp	27,600	$6,300,000
October 28	Kansas City	United States	T-Mobile Center	Grouplove; KidCutUp	27,600	$6,300,000
November 1	Montreal	Canada	Bell Centre	Grouplove; KidCutUp	32,200	$6,700,000
November 2	Montreal	Canada	Bell Centre	Grouplove; KidCutUp	32,200	$6,700,000
November 4	New York City	United States	Madison Square Garden	Grouplove; KidCutUp	29,400	$7,700,000
November 5	New York City	United States	Madison Square Garden	Grouplove; KidCutUp	29,400	$7,700,000
November 7	Indianapolis	United States	Gainbridge Fieldhouse	Grouplove; KidCutUp	—	—
November 8	Cleveland	United States	Rocket Mortgage FieldHouse	Grouplove; KidCutUp	—	—
November 11	Louisville	United States	KFC Yum! Center	Grouplove; KidCutUp	—	—
November 12	Charlotte	United States	Spectrum Center	Grouplove; KidCutUp	—	—
November 14	Miami	United States	Kaseya Center	Grouplove; KidCutUp	—	—
November 15	Sunrise	United States	Amerant Bank Arena	Grouplove; KidCutUp	—	—
November 18	Orlando	United States	Amway Center	Grouplove; KidCutUp	25,500	$5,400,000
November 19	Orlando	United States	Amway Center	Grouplove; KidCutUp	25,500	$5,400,000

List of 2024 concerts
Date (2024)	City	Country	Venue	Opening acts	Attendance	Revenue
September 3 (Note: The September 3 and 4, 2024, concerts in Tacoma, Washington were originally scheduled for October 17 and 18, 2023, but were rescheduled due undisclosed family medical matters.)	Tacoma	United States	Tacoma Dome	Sheryl Crow; KidCutUp; The Script	37,400	$6,700,000
September 4	Tacoma	United States	Tacoma Dome	Sheryl Crow; KidCutUp; The Script	37,400	$6,700,000
September 6 (Note: The September 6 and 7, 2024, concerts in Vancouver, British Columbia were originally scheduled for October 20 and 21, 2023, but were rescheduled due to a respiratory infection.)	Vancouver	Canada	Rogers Arena	Sheryl Crow; KidCutUp; The Script	28,300	$5,600,000
September 7	Vancouver	Canada	Rogers Arena	Sheryl Crow; KidCutUp; The Script	28,300	$5,600,000
October 9	Columbus	United States	Value City Arena	Sheryl Crow; KidCutUp; The Script	—	—
October 14	Detroit	United States	Little Caesars Arena	Sheryl Crow; KidCutUp; The Script	27,700	$5,600,000
October 15	Detroit	United States	Little Caesars Arena	Sheryl Crow; KidCutUp; The Script	27,700	$5,600,000
October 17	Saint Paul	United States	Xcel Energy Center	Sheryl Crow; KidCutUp; The Script	30,100	$6,600,000
October 18	Saint Paul	United States	Xcel Energy Center	Sheryl Crow; KidCutUp; The Script	30,100	$6,600,000
November 3	Austin	United States	Moody Center	Sheryl Crow; Grouplove; KidCutUp	—	—
November 8 (Note: The November 8, 2024, concert in Tulsa, Oklahoma was originally scheduled for November 28, 2023, but was rescheduled for undisclosed reasons.)	Tulsa	United States	BOK Center	Sheryl Crow; Grouplove; KidCutUp	—	—
November 11	Raleigh	United States	Lenovo Center	Sheryl Crow; Grouplove; KidCutUp	—	—
November 12	Raleigh	United States	Lenovo Center	Sheryl Crow; Grouplove; KidCutUp	—	—
November 14	Atlanta	United States	State Farm Arena	Sheryl Crow; Grouplove; KidCutUp	—	—
November 16	Birmingham	United States	Legacy Arena	Sheryl Crow; Grouplove; KidCutUp	—	—
November 20	Columbia	United States	Colonial Life Arena	Sheryl Crow; Grouplove; KidCutUp	—	—
Total					—	—

=== Canceled shows ===
List of canceled concerts
Date (2024)	City	Country	Venue	Reason	Ref.
October 20	Lincoln	United States	Pinnacle Bank Arena	Undisclosed (Note: In a statement, via Instagram, the singer said they were postponed for "reasons beyond my control.)	
October 21	Sioux Falls	United States	Denny Sanford Premier Center	Undisclosed	
October 23	Milwaukee	United States	Fiserv Forum	Undisclosed	
October 24	Des Moines	United States	Wells Fargo Arena	Undisclosed	

== Personnel ==
- Lead vocals, aerobatics, dancing, piano, executive producer, creator – Pink
- Musical director, keyboards – Jason Chapman
- Drums – Brian Frasier-Moore
- Lead guitar – Justin Derrico
- Bass guitar, vocals – Eva Gardner
- Keyboards, rhythm guitar, vocals – Adriana Balic
- Vocals – Stacy Campbell
- Vocals – Nayanna Holley
- Vocals – Dani Moz
- Dancing, dance captain – Tracy Shibata
- Dancing – Khasan Brailsford
- Dancing – Reina Hidalgo
- Dancing – Shannon Holtzapffel
- Dancing – Jeremy Hudson
- Dancing – Madelyne Spang
- Acrobatic, dancing - Christian Sanchez
- Acrobatic, dancing - Marley Tré Webster
- Acrobatic, dancing - Mo Armstrong
- Acrobatic, dancing - Jake Hinga

== See also ==
- List of Billboard Boxscore number-one concert series of the 2020s
