= Summer Carnival (tour) =

2023–2024 concert and festival tour by Pink

- Tour by Pink
- Promotional poster for the tour (2023)
- Location: Europe; North America; Oceania
- Associated album: Trustfall
- Start date: June 7, 2023
- End date: November 18, 2024
- No. of shows: 97
- Supporting acts: Pat Benatar; Brandi Carlile; Sheryl Crow; Noga Erez; Viki Gabor; Gayle; Neil Giraldo; Grouplove; KidCutUp; Margaret; Alice Merton; Rag'n'Bone Man; Sam Ryder; The Script; Gwen Stefani; Tones and I
- Attendance: 4.8 million
- Box office: US$584.7 million
- Website: pinksummercarnival.com

Pink concert chronology
- Beautiful Trauma World Tour (2018–2019); Summer Carnival (2023–2024); Trustfall Tour (2023–2024)

The Summer Carnival was the eighth concert tour by American singer Pink in support of her ninth studio album Trustfall (2023). The tour commenced on June 7, 2023, at the University of Bolton Stadium in Bolton, England, and concluded at the Camping World Stadium on November 18, 2024, in Orlando, United States. The tour included appearances at three major European music festivals: Pinkpop Festival, Werchter Boutique and BST Hyde Park. As of March 2026, it is the third highest-grossing concert tour by a woman.

== Background ==
In October 2022, Pink announced her stadium tour in the UK and Europe, which includes festivals such as BST Hyde Park, Werchter Boutique and Pinkpop Festival. On November 14, 2022, Pink announced North American dates for the tour. On February 8, 2023, The Edge announced two New Zealand shows. Seven dates in Australia were announced the next day, marking her first Australian stadium tour. On March 5, 2023, two additional dates in Australia were announced in Melbourne and Sydney. Pink also announced another date in Australia, days later, in Brisbane. On August 13, 2023, two additional dates in Melbourne and Townsville were announced, as well as Tones and I as the supporting act for the entire Oceania duration. Four days later, it was announced Pink would headline the first night of the 2023 Music Midtown in Atlanta. A second show in Townsville was announced on August 23, 2023. On September 29, 2023, she announced her Arlington, Texas, concert was postponed, due to a sinus infection; the rescheduled concert was postponed a second time for unspecified reasons and was rescheduled for November 2024. On November 21, 2023, she announced seventeen additional concerts in Europe. Two days later, an additional concert in Amsterdam was announced. On December 5, 2023, seventeen additional dates in North America were announced, with support from Sheryl Crow, KidCutUp and The Script.

In September 2024, it was announced Noga Erez would also be supporting the concerts in Tulsa and Arlington. During an interview with Women's Health magazine, Pink called herself "kind of like a circus act" and mentioned when performing she is "always on the lookout for new cool things that you might not die from."

== Critical reception ==
The tour received positive reviews from critics, who praised the spectacle of the show. Paul Brannigan of Louder Sound gave the tour five out of five stars, writing that "there's so much going on in this show that you could write a book", appreciating the political efforts in the videos and Pink's vocal abilities. Dave Simpson of The Guardian was impressed by the extravagance of the show, associating it with "a circus troupe"; Simpson appreciated the "acoustic section" where the singer "shows what she can deliver without the trappings. Her voice is intimate but powerful." Sachyn Mital of PopMatters also associated the shows "less to a carnival and more of a circus with the charismatic and candid singer as the ringleader of the unique pop spectacle", and that "while flipping through the air cements her status as one".

== Commercial performance ==
=== Boxscore and ticket sales ===
Billboard reported tour promoter Live Nation Entertainment projected the Australian concerts would be "biggest-selling Australian visit ever by a female artist." Australia's ABC News reported the singer's March 22, 2024, concert in Townsville had "sold out within 16 minutes of going on sale last week" and, as a result, accommodation prices in the city had "skyrocketed". Speaking to the news publication, Townsville Enterprise chief executive Claudia Brumme-Smith stated: "What we saw was over 60,000 people trying to get tickets." As a result of this, it is projected the two concerts will "inject almost $20 million into the region's economy", per the report.

Billboard reported the singer sold 871,000 tickets during the European leg of the tour, bringing in $106.8 million. In North America, she grossed $150.7 million from 914,000 tickets sold. According to Forbes, the Summer Carnvial tour has grossed $300 million from 37 shows as of August 2023, making it the seventh highest-grossing tour by a woman in history. In December 2023, Pollstar reported an estimated gross of $231,681,720 from 39/44 concerts, making the Summer Carnival the eighth highest-grossing concert tour of the year worldwide, and was listed as the fifth highest-grossing concert tour in North America in 2023, with a reported estimated gross of $182,629,816 for 30/33 concerts. In an August 2024 report, Billboard reported the tour had grossed $469.3 million and sold 3.6 million tickets as of July of the same year. In November 2024, Billboard reported sales of 4,800,000 tickets throughout the tour, bringing in a total gross of $584.7 million.

=== Venue records ===
List of venue records
| Year | Dates | Venue | Country | Description | Ref. |
|---|---|---|---|---|---|
| 2023 | June 7–8 | University of Bolton Stadium | England | Biggest two-day attendance (67,000+) | |
| 2023 | June 10–11 | Stadium of Light | England | First female act to perform two shows on a single tour | |
| 2023 | June 13 | Villa Park | England | First female act to headline the venue | |
| 2023 | June 24–25 | Hyde Park | England | Biggest gross by an American and overall solo act in the venue's history | |
| 2023 | July 31–August 1 | Fenway Park | United States | Biggest two-day attendance (76,564) | |
| 2023 | August 3 | Citi Field | United States | Biggest single-day attendance (42,733) | |
| 2023 | August 5 | PNC Park | United States | First female to headline the venue | |
| 2023 | August 10 | Target Field | United States | Biggest single-day attendance (44,152) | |
| 2023 | August 14 | American Family Field | United States | First female to headline a stadium in Wisconsin | |
| 2023 | August 14 | American Family Field | United States | Biggest single-day attendance (46,644) | |
| 2023 | August 16 | Comerica Park | United States | Largest concert attendance in stadium history (over 45,000) | |
| 2024 | March 8–9 | Eden Park | New Zealand | First female to headline the venue and perform two shows on a single tour | |
| 2024 | March 22–23 | Queensland Country Bank Stadium | Australia | First female to headline the venue and perform two shows on a single tour | |

== Accolades ==
List of tour accolades
| Year | Organization | Award | Recipient(s) | Result | Ref. |
|---|---|---|---|---|---|
| 2024 | Pollstar Awards | Pop Tour of the Year | Summer Carnival Tour | Won | |
| 2024 | Pollstar Awards | Road Warrior of the Year | Malcolm Weldon, Pink | Nominated | |
| 2024 | Pollstar Awards | Support / Special guest of the Year | Brandi Carlile | Won | |
| 2025 | Pollstar Awards | Pop Tour of the Year | Summer Carnival 2024 | Pending | |

== Set list ==
This set list is from the June 7, 2023, concert in Bolton. It may not represent all concerts for the tour.

1. "Get the Party Started" (contains elements of "Sweet Dreams (Are Made of This)")
2. "Raise Your Glass"
3. "Who Knew"
4. "Just Like a Pill"
5. "Try"
6. "What About Us"
7. "Turbulence"
8. "Make You Feel My Love"
9. "Just Give Me a Reason"
10. "Fuckin' Perfect"
11. "Just Like Fire" (contains elements of "Heartbreaker")
12. "Please Don't Leave Me"
13. "Cover Me in Sunshine"
14. "Kids in Love"
15. "When I Get There"
16. "I Am Here"
17. "Irrelevant"
18. "No Ordinary Love"
19. "Runaway"
20. "Trustfall"
21. "Blow Me (One Last Kiss)"
22. "Never Gonna Not Dance Again"
23. "Last Call"
24. "So What"

=== Alterations ===
- During the June 7, 8, 10, 24 and 25, and October 9, 2023, concerts, "Cover Me in Sunshine" was performed with Pink's daughter Willow Sage Hart.
- During the July 26, 2023, concert, Pink and opening act Brandi Carlile performed "Nothing Compares 2 U", as tribute to Sinéad O'Connor, who died earlier the same day. The duo reprised the performance during the August 5 and 21, 2023, concerts.
- During the July 31, 2023, concert, "Runaway" was not performed.
- During the August 16 and 19, 2023, concerts, "Don't Let Me Get Me" was performed.
- During the October 5, 2023, concert, several changes to the set list were made. "You Oughta Know" was performed with Alanis Morissette, "Heartbreaker" was performed with Pat Benatar and Neil Giraldo, "Don't Let Me Get Me" was performed in replacement of "Cover Me in Sunshine", and "Babe I'm Gonna Leave You" was performed in replacement of "Irrelevant".
- During the October 9, 2023, "Babe I'm Gonna Leave You" was performed in replacement of "Irrelevant" and "Runaway" was not performed.

== Shows ==
List of 2023 concerts
| Date | City | Country | Venue | Opening acts | Attendance | Revenue |
|---|---|---|---|---|---|---|
| June 7 | Bolton | England | University of Bolton Stadium | The Script; Gayle; KidCutUp | — | — |
| June 8 | Bolton | England | University of Bolton Stadium | The Script; Gayle; KidCutUp | — | — |
| June 10 | Sunderland | England | Stadium of Light | The Script; Gayle; KidCutUp | — | — |
| June 11 | Sunderland | England | Stadium of Light | The Script; Gayle; KidCutUp | — | — |
| June 13 | Birmingham | England | Villa Park | The Script; Gayle; KidCutUp | — | — |
| June 16 (Note: The June 16, 2023, show in Landgraaf is part of Pinkpop Festival.) | Landgraaf | Netherlands | Megaland Park | The Script; Gayle; KidCutUp | —N/a | —N/a |
| June 17 (Note: The June 17, 2023, show in Werchter is part of the Satellite Festival at Werchter Boutique.) | Werchter | Belgium | Festivalpark Werchter | The Script; Gayle; KidCutUp | —N/a | —N/a |
| June 20 | Nanterre (Note: Labeled as Paris in promotional materials.) | France | La Défense Arena | The Script; Gayle; KidCutUp | 79,996 | $8,153,396 |
| June 21 | Nanterre | France | La Défense Arena | The Script; Gayle; KidCutUp | 79,996 | $8,153,396 |
| June 24 (Note: The June 24 and 25, 2023, shows in London are part of BST Hyde Park.) | London | England | Hyde Park | Sam Ryder; Gayle; KidCutUp; Gwen Stefani | —N/a | —N/a |
| June 25 | London | England | Hyde Park | Sam Ryder; Gayle; KidCutUp; Gwen Stefani | —N/a | —N/a |
| June 28 | Berlin | Germany | Olympiastadion | The Script; Gayle; KidCutUp | 57,524 | $6,461,778 |
| July 1 | Vienna | Austria | Ernst-Happel-Stadion | Alice Merton; Gayle; KidCutUp | — | — |
| July 2 | Vienna | Austria | Ernst-Happel-Stadion | The Script; Gayle; KidCutUp | — | — |
| July 5 | Munich | Germany | Olympiastadion | The Script; Gayle; KidCutUp | 111,435 | $12,177,223 |
| July 6 | Munich | Germany | Olympiastadion | The Script; Gayle; KidCutUp | 111,435 | $12,177,223 |
| July 8 | Cologne | Germany | RheinEnergieStadion | The Script; Gayle; KidCutUp | — | — |
| July 9 | Cologne | Germany | RheinEnergieStadion | The Script; Gayle; KidCutUp | — | — |
| July 12 | Hanover | Germany | HDI-Arena | The Script; Gayle; KidCutUp | — | — |
| July 13 | Hanover | Germany | HDI-Arena | The Script; Gayle; KidCutUp | — | — |
| July 16 | Warsaw | Poland | PGE Narodowy | Margaret; KidCutUp; Viki Gabor | — | — |
| July 24 | Toronto | Canada | Rogers Centre | Grouplove; KidCutUp; Brandi Carlile | 45,741 | $7,330,327 |
| July 26 | Cincinnati | United States | Great American Ball Park | Grouplove; KidCutUp; Brandi Carlile | 40,800 | $6,912,375 |
| July 31 | Boston | United States | Fenway Park | Grouplove; KidCutUp; Pat Benatar; Neil Giraldo | 78,081 | $13,600,204 |
| August 1 | Boston | United States | Fenway Park | Grouplove; KidCutUp; Pat Benatar; Neil Giraldo | 78,081 | $13,600,204 |
| August 3 | New York City | United States | Citi Field | Grouplove; KidCutUp; Brandi Carlile | 43,700 | $8,300,000 |
| August 5 | Pittsburgh | United States | PNC Park | Grouplove; KidCutUp; Brandi Carlile | 43,194 | $6,835,257 |
| August 7 | Washington, D.C. | United States | Nationals Park | Grouplove; KidCutUp; Pat Benatar; Neil Giraldo | 43,487 | $7,222,988 |
| August 10 | Minneapolis | United States | Target Field | Grouplove; KidCutUp; Pat Benatar; Neil Giraldo | 42,330 | $7,732,241 |
| August 12 | Chicago | United States | Wrigley Field | Grouplove; KidCutUp; Pat Benatar; Neil Giraldo | 42,129 | $8,260,117 |
| August 14 | Milwaukee | United States | American Family Field | Grouplove; KidCutUp; Pat Benatar; Neil Giraldo | 46,700 | $7,256,942 |
| August 16 | Detroit | United States | Comerica Park | Grouplove; KidCutUp; Brandi Carlile | 44,904 | $6,570,825 |
| August 19 | Fargo | United States | Fargodome | Grouplove; KidCutUp; Brandi Carlile | — | — |
| August 21 | Omaha | United States | Charles Schwab Field Omaha | Grouplove; KidCutUp; Brandi Carlile | — | — |
| September 15 (Note: The September 15, 2023, show in Atlanta is part of Music Midtown 2023.) | Atlanta | United States | Piedmont Park | —N/a | —N/a | —N/a |
| September 18 | Philadelphia | United States | Citizens Bank Park | Grouplove; KidCutUp; Brandi Carlile | 93,185 | $14,249,206 |
| September 19 | Philadelphia | United States | Citizens Bank Park | Grouplove; KidCutUp; Brandi Carlile | 93,185 | $14,249,206 |
| September 22 | Nashville | United States | Geodis Park | Grouplove; KidCutUp; Brandi Carlile | — | — |
| September 25 | San Antonio | United States | Alamodome | Grouplove; KidCutUp; Brandi Carlile | — | — |
| September 27 | Houston | United States | Minute Maid Park | Grouplove; KidCutUp; Brandi Carlile | — | — |
| October 3 | San Diego | United States | Snapdragon Stadium | Grouplove; KidCutUp; Brandi Carlile | 32,600 | $6,100,000 |
| October 5 | Inglewood | United States | SoFi Stadium | Grouplove; KidCutUp; Pat Benatar; Neil Giraldo | 49,559 | $8,104,762 |
| October 7 | Paradise (Note: Labelled as Las Vegas in promotional material.) | United States | Allegiant Stadium | Grouplove; KidCutUp; Brandi Carlile | 54,693 | $8,969,920 |
| October 9 | Phoenix | United States | Chase Field | Grouplove; KidCutUp; Brandi Carlile | 53,437 | $7,795,413 |

List of 2024 concerts
| Date | City | Country | Venue | Opening acts | Attendance | Revenue |
|---|---|---|---|---|---|---|
| February 9 | Sydney | Australia | Allianz Stadium | Tones and I KidCutUp | 78,500 | $9,800,000 |
| February 10 | Sydney | Australia | Allianz Stadium | Tones and I KidCutUp | 78,500 | $9,800,000 |
| February 13 | Newcastle | Australia | McDonald Jones Stadium | Tones and I KidCutUp | — | — |
| February 16 | Brisbane | Australia | Suncorp Stadium | Tones and I KidCutUp | 94,600 | $11,000,000 |
| February 17 | Brisbane | Australia | Suncorp Stadium | Tones and I KidCutUp | 94,600 | $11,000,000 |
| February 20 | Gold Coast | Australia | Heritage Bank Stadium | Tones and I KidCutUp | — | — |
| February 23 | Melbourne | Australia | Marvel Stadium | Tones and I KidCutUp | 124,000 | $13,200,000 |
| February 24 | Melbourne | Australia | Marvel Stadium | Tones and I KidCutUp | 124,000 | $13,200,000 |
| February 27 | Adelaide | Australia | Adelaide Oval | Tones and I KidCutUp | 59,200 | $5,900,000 |
| March 1 | Perth | Australia | Optus Stadium | Tones and I KidCutUp | 121,000 | $11,300,000 |
| March 2 | Perth | Australia | Optus Stadium | Tones and I KidCutUp | 121,000 | $11,300,000 |
| March 5 | Dunedin | New Zealand | Forsyth Barr Stadium | Tones and I KidCutUp | — | — |
| March 8 | Auckland | New Zealand | Eden Park | Tones and I KidCutUp | 97,500 | $9,600,000 |
| March 9 | Auckland | New Zealand | Eden Park | Tones and I KidCutUp | 97,500 | $9,600,000 |
| March 12 | Melbourne | Australia | Marvel Stadium | Tones and I KidCutUp | 107,000 | $11,600,000 |
| March 13 | Melbourne | Australia | Marvel Stadium | Tones and I KidCutUp | 107,000 | $11,600,000 |
| March 16 | Sydney | Australia | Accor Stadium | Tones and I KidCutUp | 74,000 | $7,900,000 |
| March 19 | Brisbane | Australia | Suncorp Stadium | Tones and I KidCutUp | — | — |
| March 22 | Townsville | Australia | Queensland Country Bank Stadium | Tones and I KidCutUp | 60,100 | $6,600,000 |
| March 23 | Townsville | Australia | Queensland Country Bank Stadium | Tones and I KidCutUp | 60,100 | $6,600,000 |
| June 11 | Cardiff | Wales | Principality Stadium | Gayle; KidCutUp; The Script | — | — |
| June 15 | London | England | Tottenham Hotspur Stadium | Gayle; KidCutUp; The Script | — | — |
| June 16 | London | England | Tottenham Hotspur Stadium | Gayle; KidCutUp; The Script | — | — |
| June 20 | Dublin | Ireland | Aviva Stadium | Gayle; KidCutUp; Rag'n'Bone Man | 101,388 | $13,400,000 |
| June 21 | Dublin | Ireland | Aviva Stadium | Gayle; KidCutUp; Rag'n'Bone Man | 101,388 | $13,400,000 |
| June 24 | Liverpool | England | Anfield | Gayle; KidCutUp; The Script | — | — |
| June 25 | Liverpool | England | Anfield | Gayle; KidCutUp; The Script | — | — |
| June 28 | Glasgow | Scotland | Hampden Park | Gayle; KidCutUp; The Script | — | — |
| June 29 | Glasgow | Scotland | Hampden Park | Gayle; KidCutUp; The Script | — | — |
| July 6 | Copenhagen | Denmark | Parken Stadium | Gayle; KidCutUp; The Script | — | — |
| July 10 | Amsterdam | Netherlands | Johan Cruijff Arena | Gayle; KidCutUp; The Script | 105,000 | $13,600,000 |
| July 11 | Amsterdam | Netherlands | Johan Cruijff Arena | Gayle; KidCutUp; The Script | 105,000 | $13,600,000 |
| July 14 | Brussels | Belgium | King Baudouin Stadium | Gayle; KidCutUp; The Script | — | – |
| July 17 | Leipzig | Germany | Red Bull Arena | Gayle; KidCutUp; The Script | 41,437 | $7,400,000 |
| July 19 | Stuttgart | Germany | MHPArena | Gayle; KidCutUp; The Script | 43,344 | $6,900,000 |
| July 21 | Mönchengladbach | Germany | Borussia-Park | Gayle; KidCutUp; The Script | 42,125 | $5,400,000 |
| July 25 | Stockholm | Sweden | Friends Arena | Gayle; KidCutUp; The Script | — | — |
| August 10 | St. Louis | United States | The Dome at America's Center | Sheryl Crow; KidCutUp; The Script | — | — |
| August 14 | Toronto | Canada | Rogers Centre | Sheryl Crow; KidCutUp; The Script | — | — |
| August 18 | Philadelphia | United States | Lincoln Financial Field | Sheryl Crow; KidCutUp; The Script | 54,600 | $8,300,000 |
| August 21 | Foxborough | United States | Gillette Stadium | Sheryl Crow; KidCutUp; The Script | 55,700 | $10,800,000 |
| August 24 | Chicago | United States | Soldier Field | Sheryl Crow; KidCutUp; The Script | 52,300 | $9,400,000 |
| August 28 | Missoula | United States | Washington–Grizzly Stadium | Sheryl Crow; KidCutUp; The Script | — | — |
| August 31 | Edmonton | Canada | Commonwealth Stadium | Sheryl Crow; KidCutUp; The Script | 56,000 | $9,100,000 |
| September 11 | San Diego | United States | Petco Park | Sheryl Crow; KidCutUp; The Script | — | — |
| September 13 | Paradise | United States | Allegiant Stadium | Sheryl Crow; KidCutUp; The Script | 47,000 | $6,600,000 |
| September 15 | Los Angeles | United States | Dodger Stadium | Sheryl Crow; KidCutUp; The Script | — | — |
| October 1 | Hershey | United States | Hersheypark Stadium | Sheryl Crow; KidCutUp; The Script | 29,700 | $5,700,000 |
| October 3 | East Rutherford | United States | MetLife Stadium | Sheryl Crow; KidCutUp; The Script | 60,400 | $9,100,000 |
| October 6 | Syracuse | United States | JMA Wireless Dome | Sheryl Crow; KidCutUp; The Script | 37,300 | $7,100,000 |
| October 12 | Indianapolis | United States | Lucas Oil Stadium | Sheryl Crow; KidCutUp; The Script | 55,400 | $6,900,000 |
| November 6 (Note: The November 6, 2024, concert was originally scheduled for September 29, 2023, but was postponed to November 23, 2023, due to Pink having a sinus infection. The rescheduled concert was postponed a second time for unspecified reasons.) | Arlington | United States | Globe Life Field | Sheryl Crow; KidCutUp; Noga Erez | — | — |
| November 18 | Orlando | United States | Camping World Stadium | Sheryl Crow; KidCutUp; Noga Erez | — | — |
| Total | | | | | — | $610,800,000 |

=== Canceled shows ===
List of canceled concerts
| Date (2024) | City | Country | Venue | Reason | Ref. |
|---|---|---|---|---|---|
| July 3 | Bern | Switzerland | Stadion Wankdorf | Unspecified health issue | |
| November 23 | Miami | United States | LoanDepot Park | Unspecified health issue | |

== See also ==
- List of Billboard Boxscore number-one concert series of the 2020s
- List of highest-grossing concert tours by women
