= Blow Me (One Last Kiss) =

2012 single by Pink

Single by Pink

from the album The Truth About Love
- B-side: "The King Is Dead but the Queen Is Alive"
- Released: July 2, 2012
- Recorded: 2012
- Studio: Earthstar Creation Center (Venice, California); Echo Studios (Los Angeles, California)
- Genre: Electropop; pop rock
- Length: 4:15 (album version); 3:50 (radio edit)
- Label: RCA
- Songwriters: Pink; Greg Kurstin
- Producer: Kurstin

Pink singles chronology
"Bridge of Light" (2011)	"Blow Me (One Last Kiss)" (2012)	"Try" (2012)

Music videos
- "Blow Me (One Last Kiss)" on YouTube; "Blow Me (One Last Kiss)" (Color version) on YouTube

"Blow Me (One Last Kiss)" is a song by American singer-songwriter Pink from her sixth studio album, The Truth About Love (2012). Pink wrote the song with its producer Greg Kurstin. The song was released as the lead single from the album on July 2, 2012, by RCA Records, shortly after a demo version leaked on to the internet. It is an uptempo electropop and pop rock song with synthesizers, keyboards, and bass drums as part of the instrumentation. Lyrically, it finds Pink reflecting on past relationships and life situations.

The song received generally positive reviews from music critics, who praised the production. Some complimented its lyrics and anthemic nature, with comparisons being drawn to Kelly Clarkson's music. Commercially, "Blow Me (One Last Kiss)" attained success, peaking at number five on the US Billboard Hot 100 and becoming Pink's 12th top-10 single on the chart. The song topped the charts in Australia, Hungary, and Scotland, while peaking within the top-10 in other countries, including Canada, Germany, and the United Kingdom. The song has received several certifications, including being certified quintuple platinum in Australia by the Australian Recording Industry Association (ARIA).

The accompanying music video was directed by Dave Meyers and released on July 26, 2012. It depicts Pink taking revenge and crashing the wedding of a former lover. To promote The Truth About Love, the singer performed the song on several occasions, including the 2012 MTV Video Music Awards. Pink included "Blow Me (One Last Kiss)" on the set lists for four of her world tours, The Truth About Love Tour (2013–2014), Beautiful Trauma World Tour (2018–2019), Summer Carnival Tour (2023–2024) and the Trustfall Tour (2023–2024).

== Background and development ==
While conceiving The Truth About Love, Pink worked with longtime collaborator Greg Kurstin, who had previously contributed to her fourth studio album I'm Not Dead (2006). Pink commented on the experience of reuniting with Kurstin, saying she was keen on working with him again and waited for the right opportunity. "Blow Me (One Last Kiss)" was developed from a nine-day songwriting session between Pink and Kurstin. Upon hearing the instrumental composition, Pink felt inspired and started penning the song's lyrics. She pictured herself "at 2 a.m., in New York, dancing, drunk, letting off steam [with] all [her] punk-rock friends" while they sang along.

In an interview with Billboard, Kurstin revealed that he and the singer faced difficulty in coming up with a title for the track, which also had different lyrics. He detailed, "[Pink] kept coming back to 'Let's throw in the towel,' and it was one of those things where we had to say, 'Is that line really the song?'" Kurstin later suggested using the phrase "Blow me … one last kiss", which ignited her interest. The writing and recording process was completed over the course of one day in 2012. Prior to the song's release, Pink considered titling it "Blow Me", but RCA Records added the bracketed "One Last Kiss" to avoid a double entendre.

== Composition and lyrical interpretation ==
"Blow Me (One Last Kiss)"
A 25-second sample of the chorus, which features an electropop beat with synthesizers, keyboards, and guitars, accompanied by Modest Mouse-influenced rock riffs.

Musically, "Blow Me (One Last Kiss)" is an upbeat electropop and pop rock song. It has a length of four minutes and fifteen seconds (4:15). The song's instrumentation incorporates synthesizers, keyboards, bass drums, guitars, and sirens. Marc Hogan of Spin and Jonathan Bogart of The Atlantic both noted similarities between "Blow Me (One Last Kiss)" and Modest Mouse's 2004 song "Float On", referring to the "punchy" rock riffs used. Musicnotes.com published this song in the key of G major and set in the time signature of common time with a moderate tempo of 116 beats per minute. The verses have a G_{6}–G–Bm–Em–C chord progression, and the chorus follows a G–Bm–Em_{7}–C sequence. Pink's vocal range spans from E_{3} to G_{5}.

Various contemporary critics viewed the song as a breakup anthem. Helena De Bertodano of The Daily Telegraph summed the song up as an "angry, defiant ode to the implosion of a relationship". Greg Kot of the Chicago Tribune characterized "Blow Me (One Last Kiss)" as "bittersweet" and described the song as a representation of "heart-break, exasperation and [Pink's] desire to move on" from a relationship. On a similar note, Andrew Hampp from Billboard wrote that the song "finds the singer contemplating the end of her tumultuous 10-year relationship" with her husband Carey Hart.

Pink explained that the lyrics were partly inspired by the year-long separation from her husband, as well as feeling frustrated over different situations in love or life. The opening lines, "White knuckles / And sweaty palms from hangin' on too tight / Clenched shut jaw / I've got another headache again tonight", describe self-destructive behavior and people's fear of losing something important. The chorus finds Pink singing "I think I finally had enough / I think I maybe think too much / I think this might be it for us / Blow me one last kiss" over a "pumping" pop beat.

== Release and reception ==
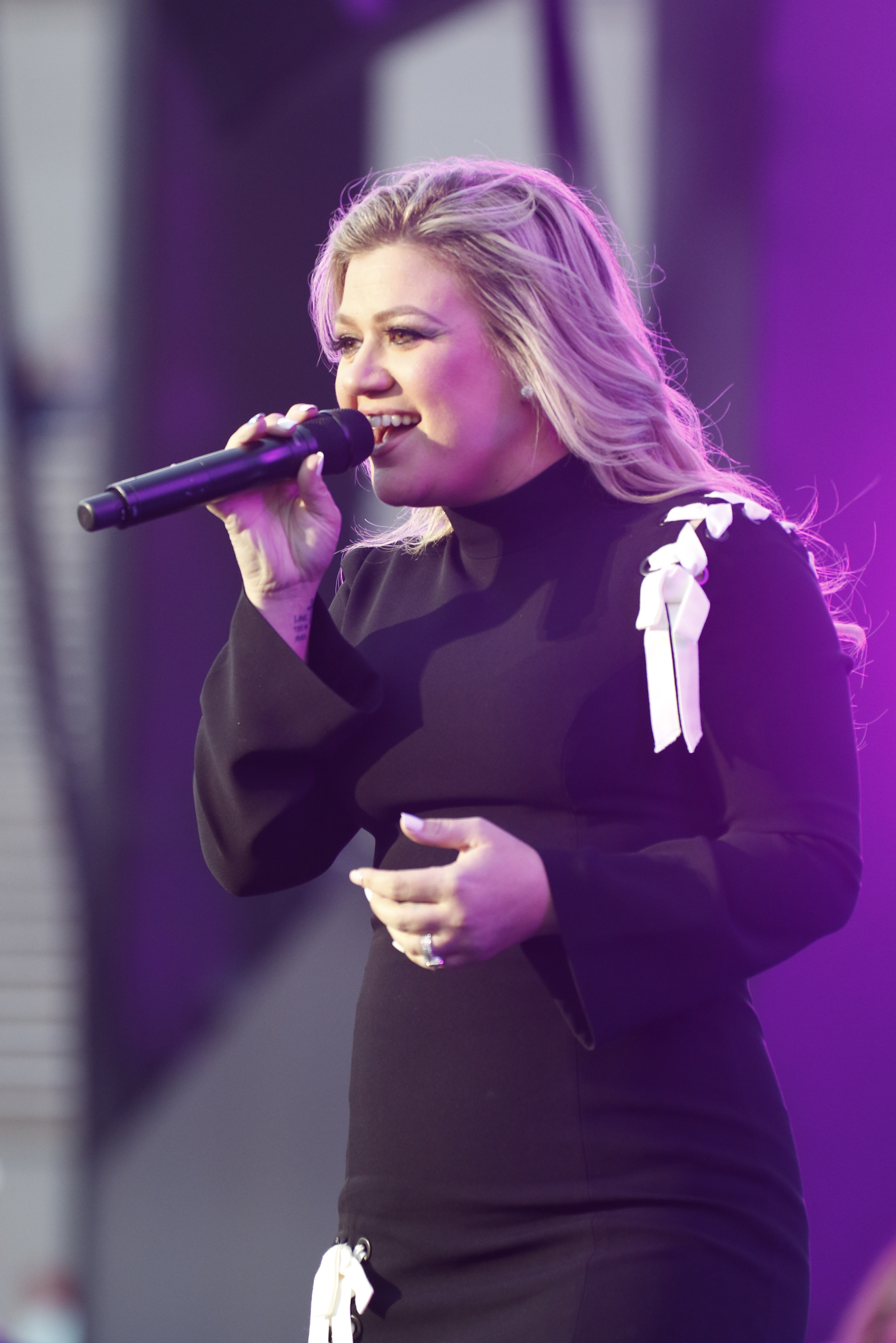
Several critics opined that "Blow Me (One Last Kiss)" is reminiscent of Kelly Clarkson's music.

On June 19, 2012, Pink announced "Blow Me (One Last Kiss)" as the lead single from The Truth About Love, confirming that it would be released on July 9. However, the demo version of the song leaked onto the Internet one week ahead of schedule. In response, the release date had to be pushed forward. "Blow Me (One Last Kiss)" was released for streaming via Pink's website on July 2, 2012, and for digital download in various countries the following day, through RCA Records. In Germany, the song was released for digital download and serviced to contemporary hit radio stations on July 6, 2012, through Sony Music. It impacted US hot adult contemporary and contemporary hit radio on July 10, 2012. A CD single version of the song was released in Australia and Germany on July 27, 2012, by Sony Music. The release of "Blow Me (One Last Kiss)" was delayed in the United Kingdom. RCA Records distributed the song to UK mainstream radio stations on August 22, 2012, before releasing it for digital download on August 31, 2012.

Upon release, "Blow Me (One Last Kiss)" was met with generally positive reviews from music critics. In her review of The Truth About Love, Sarah Grant from Consequence of Sound compared the song to Kelly Clarkson's 2009 single, "My Life Would Suck Without You", and noted that Pink "has a special knack for filtering the current trend through her own musical lens". Hogan applauded the song's catchiness and the "mix of bawdiness and earnestness". Writing for MTV News, Jocelyn Vena highlighted the song's "anthemic chorus" and "lyrical edge", further commenting that it contains "the signature girl-power sass that Kelly frequently has on her own tracks". While reviewing the album, USA Today's writer Elysa Gardner praised the song's lyrics for portraying "a blunt, graphic assessment of a failed relationship". In his review of the song, Andrew Hampp of Billboard awarded a rating of 85 out of 100 and deemed it as a return to form, and an "empowering breakup anthem in the vein of 'So What'". Hampp later opined that "Blow Me (One Last Kiss)" captures the essence of The Truth About Love.

The Guardian's Caroline Sullivan lauded it as an "irresistible, hobnailed kiss-off". Bogart spotlighted "Blow Me (One Last Kiss)" among instances where "Pink's rock fetish remains as strong as ever". Tanner Stransky of Entertainment Weekly viewed the song's lyrics as "sharp" and described its music direction as "something that Clarkson could have featured on her own album". Similarly, Melissa Maerz from the same publication gave "Blow Me (One Last Kiss)" a B+ rating and positively compared it to Clarkson's 2004 song "Since U Been Gone". Robert Copsey of Digital Spy selected the song as an example for "[putting] to bed any notion that [Pink] lost her sense of humour or the ability to laugh at herself". In a mixed review, Sal Cinquemani from Slant Magazine commended the song's "catchy" production, but criticized Pink for "playing it safe".

== Commercial performance ==
On the issue dated July 21, 2012, "Blow Me (One Last Kiss)" debuted at number 41 on the US Digital Songs with 48,000 copies sold. The song entered the Billboard Hot 100 at number 58, and the Radio Songs chart at number 56, with 22 million audience impressions. The following week, it rose 49 positions, reaching number nine on the Hot 100 and giving Pink her 12th top-10 single on the chart. Pink joined Beyoncé and Rihanna as the third female artist with the most top-tens since 2000. The song also garnered a 259% increase in digital sales, peaking at number four on the Digital Songs chart with 171,000 downloads. "Blow Me (One Last Kiss)" peaked at number five on the Hot 100 issue dated September 29, 2012. The single also achieved success on Billboard component charts. It spent three consecutive weeks at number one on the US Radio Songs chart, reaching 121 million audience impressions. The song additionally peaked atop the Mainstream Top 40, Adult Pop Songs, and Dance Club Songs charts. By July 2013, it had sold 2.1 million digital copies in the United States.

On the Canadian Hot 100, "Blow Me (One Last Kiss)" peaked at number four, and was certified triple platinum by Music Canada (MC), denoting sales of 240,000 units in Canada. The song debuted at number three on the UK Singles Chart issue dated September 15, 2012. It has received a platinum certification by the British Phonographic Industry (BPI), with over 600,000 certified units in the United Kingdom.

Elsewhere, "Blow Me (One Last Kiss)" reached number one in Hungary, alongside peaking within the top 10 in Germany, Japan, Czech Republic, South Africa and Poland. In Australia, the song debuted at number one on the ARIA Singles Chart, becoming Pink's sixth song to reach the summit. It was certified septuple platinum by the Australian Recording Industry Association (ARIA) for accumulating sales of 350,000 equivalent units in Australia. "Blow Me (One Last Kiss)" peaked at number eight on the New Zealand Top 40 Singles chart and later received a platinum certification by Recorded Music NZ (RMNZ) for sales of 15,000 units in the country. It reached top twenty in Sweden, Austria, Belgium, Finland, Switzerland and Spain then the top thirty in France, the Netherlands and Denmark.

== Music video ==
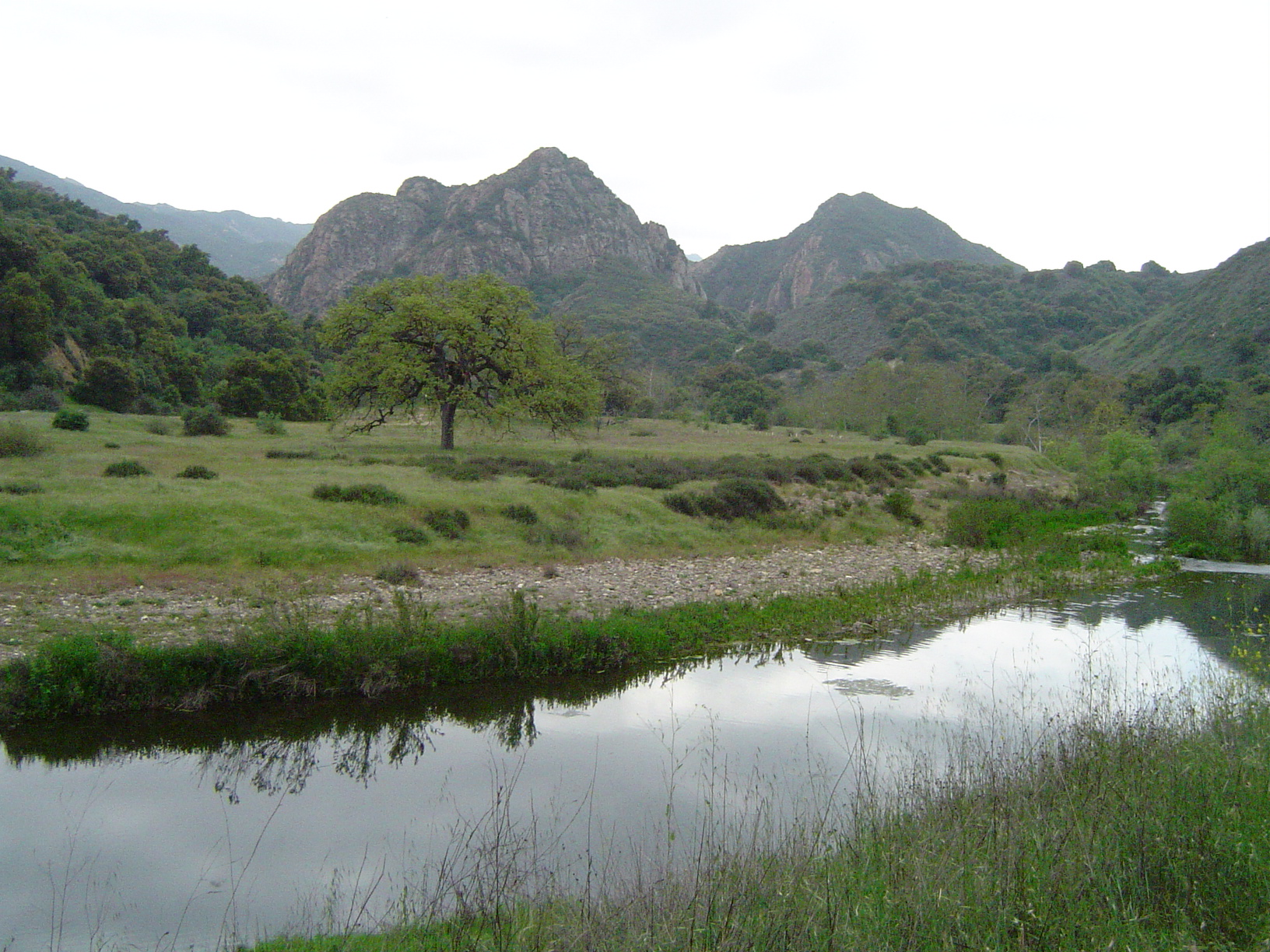
The video was primarily shot at Malibu Creek State Park, California.

The music video for "Blow Me (One Last Kiss)" was directed by Pink's longtime collaborator Dave Meyers and filmed at Malibu Creek State Park, California. It is entirely in black and white, with splashes of red. According to Meyers, the video is based on a "French countryside love story". Sebastian de la Forza appears in the video as Pink's love interest. It premiered via MTV on July 26, 2012. A colored version was also released on August 30, 2012.

The video begins with Pink having a picnic with her love interest. The two lean in for a kiss, which is interrupted by him taking a phone call. Pink disappointedly splashes his face with red wine and walks away. There, Pink meets another man on his motorbike and she gets a lift. He sketches a portrait of her while Pink watches as many female guests arrive for a party the man has organized. During the party, Pink is seen dancing with one of the women until she is interrupted by a marriage proposal from her love interest. However, Pink finds out that the proposal was meant for her dance partner. Subsequently, Pink attends their wedding donning a black dress, resembling a funeral. A flying bicycle appears above the guests, which is carrying a giant heart-shaped balloon. After that, the balloon pops, and red liquid covers the guests as Pink laughs. At the end of the video, she joins the driver of the flying bicycle and they fly away together into the sunset.

Hogan described the video as "cinematic" and compared the black and white style with "an Instagram-style old-film look". David Greenwald from Billboard opined that the video pays homage to "vintage French cinema". Rolling Stone wrote that the music video "emphasizes [Pink's] personal strength". Kyle Anderson of Entertainment Weekly said Pink "casts herself as a fancy lass" from the silent film era "who has had enough with the men in her life". Caroline Frost from The Huffington Post called the video's style of black and white "sombre but stylish". James Montgomery of MTV News called the video "a whimsical nod to classic French cinema" and praised the "overwrought emoting and smoky, dream-like scenery". Montgomery also noted that Pink "returns to the role she knows best: She's always the bridesmaid, never the bride".

== Live performances and other usage ==
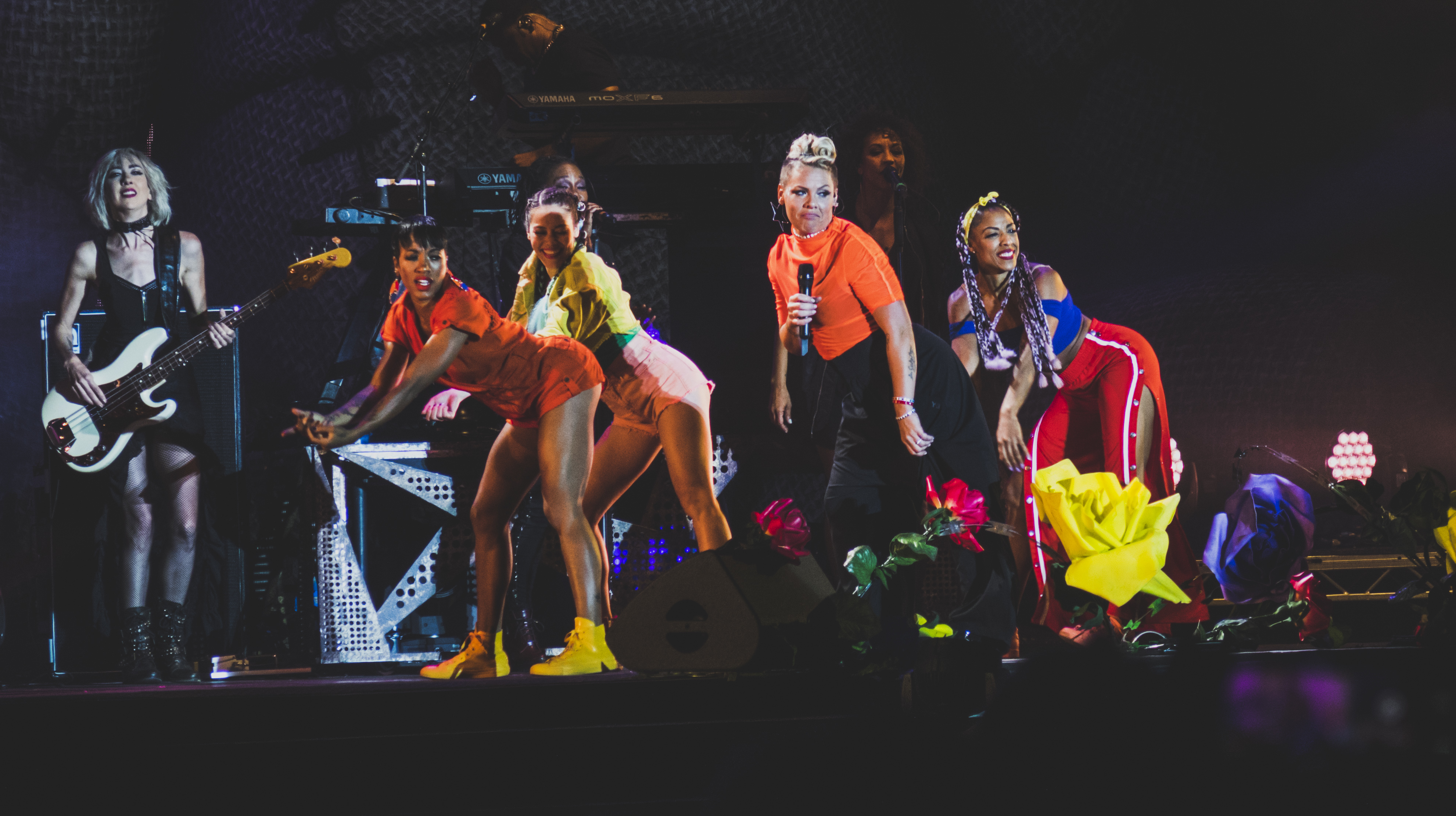
Pink and her dancers performing "Blow Me (One Last Kiss)" during the 2017 V Festival

Pink's first live performance of "Blow Me (One Last Kiss)" took place during the 2012 MTV Video Music Awards. For the performance of the song, Pink wore a sleeveless white T-shirt, short black pants, suspenders, fishnets, and heels. The performance began with the intro of "Get the Party Started" (2001) as Pink stood on a small platform, playing on a keyboard and a drum pad. She then strapped into a harness and floated above the crowd to the main stage to perform "Blow Me (One Last Kiss)". Pink was accompanied by her band and surrounded by her background dancers who wore costumes shaped like giant red lips. She concluded the performance by floating above the audience on a pair of oversized lips. On September 10, 2012, as part of the promotion of The Truth About Love, Pink sang the song on The Ellen DeGeneres Show and Le Grand Journal.

On September 14, 2012, Pink performed the song during a special concert at Circus Krone, in Munich. Pink later performed "Blow Me (One Last Kiss)" on television shows including Alan Carr: Chatty Man, Today, The View, The Daily Show, and Australia's Today. On November 13, 2012, Pink performed the song for VH1 Storytellers. She also played the song at music festivals, including the iTunes Festival on September 13, the iHeartRadio Music Festival on September 22, the "Power of Pink" benefit concert on November 12, and the Jingle Bell Ball on December 9. On The Truth About Love Tour (2013–2014), Pink performed "Blow Me (One Last Kiss)" as the penultimate track of the tour's setlist, before the show's encore "So What". She sang the song surrounded by her dancers while dancing around an oversized chaise longue.

In 2017, Pink performed an Afrobeat reggae version of the song at music festivals Summerfest, Festival d'été de Québec, Atlantic City Beachfest Concert Series, and the V Festival. She again performed "Blow Me (One Last Kiss)" at the 2017 MTV Video Music Awards as part of a greatest-hits medley. "Blow Me (One Last Kiss)" was included on the setlist of Pink's Beautiful Trauma World Tour (2018–2019), where it was performed as the last song before the encore. For the performance of the song, Pink performed an energetic choreography with 10 background dancers. On October 5, 2019, Pink performed "Blow Me (One Last Kiss)" during her show at the Rock in Rio festival, held in Rio de Janeiro. In 2012, Marley Rose (Melissa Benoist) and Wade "Unique" Adams (Alex Newell) performed "Blow Me (One Last Kiss)" in the 2012 Glee episode "The Role You Were Born to Play".

Pink also included the song on the setlist on her Summer Carnival and Trustfall Tour, respectively.

== Track listings ==
Digital download
No.	Title	Length
1.	"Blow Me (One Last Kiss)"	4:15

Digital download
No.	Title	Length
1.	"Blow Me (One Last Kiss)" (Radio Edit)	3:50
2.	"Blow Me (One Last Kiss)" (Squeaky Radio Edit)	3:50
3.	"Blow Me (One Last Kiss)" (Explicit Radio Edit)	3:50

CD single
No.	Title	Length
1.	"Blow Me (One Last Kiss)"	4:15
2.	"The King Is Dead But The Queen Is Alive"	3:44

== Credits and personnel ==
Credits adapted from the liner notes of the CD single and The Truth About Love.

Management

- Published by EMI Blackwood Music, Inc./P!nk Inside Publishing (BMI), Kurstin Music/EMI April Music, Inc. (ASCAP)
- Engineered at Earthstar Creation Center, Venice, California, and at Echo Studios, Los Angeles, California
- Mixed at MixStar Studios, Virginia Beach, VA

Personnel

- Pink – songwriter
- Greg Kurstin – songwriter, producer, keyboards, guitar, bass, programming, engineer
- Jesse Shatkin – additional engineering
- Serban Ghenea – mixing
- John Hanes – engineered for mix
- Phil Seaford – assistant engineered for mix

== Charts ==
=== Weekly charts ===
Weekly chart performance for "Blow Me (One Last Kiss)"
Chart (2012–2013)	Peak position
Australia (ARIA)	1
Austria (Ö3 Austria Top 40)	14
Belgium (Ultratop 50 Flanders)	36
Belgium (Ultratop 50 Wallonia)	14
Brazil (Billboard Hot 100 Airplay)	12
Brazil (Billboard Hot Pop Songs)	2
Canada Hot 100 (Billboard)	4
Canada AC (Billboard)	7
Canada CHR/Top 40 (Billboard)	1
Canada Hot AC (Billboard)	1
CIS Airplay (TopHit)	8
Croatia International Airplay (HRT)	2
Czech Republic Airplay (ČNS IFPI)	4
Danish Airplay (Nielsen Soundscan)	1
Denmark (Tracklisten)	24
European Airplay (Nielsen Soundscan)	1
Euro Digital Song Sales (Billboard)	3
Finland Download (Latauslista)	14
France (SNEP)	22
Germany (GfK)	10
Honduras (Honduras Top 50)	10
Hungary (Rádiós Top 40)	1
Ireland (IRMA)	11
Italy (FIMI)	14
Japan Hot 100 (Billboard)	3
Lebanon (Lebanese Top 20)	8
Luxembourg Digital Song Sales (Billboard)	5
Mexico (Billboard Ingles Airplay)	3
Mexico Anglo (Monitor Latino)	6
Netherlands (Dutch Top 40)	14
Netherlands (Single Top 100)	22
New Zealand (Recorded Music NZ)	8
Poland Airplay (ZPAV)	3
Romania (Airplay 100)	72
Russia Airplay (TopHit)	17
Scottish Singles Sales (Official Charts)	1
Slovakia Airplay (ČNS IFPI)	6
South Africa (Mediaguide)	2
South Korea International Singles (Gaon)	138
Spain (Promusicae)	18
Sweden (DigiListan)	13
Switzerland (Schweizer Hitparade)	15
Ukraine Airplay (TopHit)	65
UK Singles (Official Charts)	3
US Billboard Hot 100	5
US Adult Contemporary (Billboard)	11
US Adult Pop Airplay (Billboard)	1
US Dance Club Songs (Billboard)	1
US Dance Airplay (Billboard)	1
US Pop Airplay (Billboard)	1
US Rhythmic Airplay (Billboard)	20

=== Monthly charts ===
Monthly chart performance for "Blow Me (One Last Kiss)"
Chart (August 2012)	Peak position
Russia Airplay (TopHit)	17
Ukraine Airplay (TopHit)	72

=== Year-end charts ===
Year-end chart performance for "Blow Me (One Last Kiss)"
Chart (2012)	Position
Australia (ARIA)	48
Brazil (Crowley)	73
Canada (Canadian Hot 100)	33
Croatia International Airplay (HRT)	23
France (SNEP)	161
Germany (Official German Charts)	91
Hungary (Rádiós Top 40)	22
Italy (FIMI)	65
Japan (Japan Hot 100)	83
Netherlands (Dutch Top 40)	59
New Zealand (Recorded Music NZ)	47
Russia Airplay (TopHit)	128
Ukraine Airplay (TopHit)	139
UK Singles (Official Charts Company)	88
US Billboard Hot 100	37
US Adult Contemporary (Billboard)	31
US Adult Top 40 (Billboard)	10
US Dance Club Songs (Billboard)	8
US Dance/Mix Show Airplay (Billboard)	30
US Mainstream Top 40 (Billboard)	19

Chart (2013)	Position
US Adult Contemporary (Billboard)	43

== Certifications ==
Certifications and sales for "Blow Me (One Last Kiss)"
Region	Certification	Certified units/sales
Australia (ARIA)	5× Platinum	350,000^{‡}
Brazil (Pro-Música Brasil)	Platinum	60,000^{‡}
Canada (Music Canada)	4× Platinum	320,000^{‡}
Germany (BVMI)	Gold	150,000^{‡}
Italy (FIMI)	Platinum	30,000^{*}
Mexico (AMPROFON)	Gold	30,000^{*}
New Zealand (RMNZ)	Platinum	15,000^{*}
Switzerland (IFPI Switzerland)	Gold	10,000^{^}
United Kingdom (BPI)	Platinum	600,000^{‡}
United States	—	2,164,000
Streaming
Denmark (IFPI Danmark)	Gold	900,000^{†}
^{*} Sales figures based on certification alone.^{^} Shipments figures based on certification alone.^{‡} Sales+streaming figures based on certification alone.^{†} Streaming-only figures based on certification alone.

== Release history ==
Release dates and formats for "Blow Me (One Last Kiss)"
Region	Date	Format(s)	Label	Ref.
Various	July 2, 2012	Streaming	RCA Records	
Various	July 3, 2012	Digital download	RCA Records	
Germany	July 6, 2012	Digital download	Sony Music	
Germany	July 6, 2012	Contemporary hit radio	Sony Music	
United States	July 10, 2012	Contemporary hit radio	RCA Records	
United States	July 10, 2012	Hot adult contemporary	RCA Records	
United States	July 17, 2012	Rhythmic contemporary	RCA Records	
Australia	July 27, 2012	CD single	Sony Music	
Germany	July 27, 2012	CD single	Sony Music	
United Kingdom	August 22, 2012	Contemporary hit radio	RCA Records	
United Kingdom	August 31, 2012	Digital download	RCA Records	
United States	September 14, 2012	Adult contemporary radio	RCA Records	

== See also ==
- List of number-one singles of 2012 (Australia)
- List of Adult Top 40 number-one songs of the 2010s
- List of Billboard Dance Club Songs number ones of 2012
- List of number-one dance airplay hits of 2012 (U.S.)
- List of Billboard Mainstream Top 40 number-one songs of 2012
