= List of Billboard Mainstream Top 40 number-one songs of 2012 =

This is a list of songs which reached number one on the Billboard Mainstream Top 40 (or Pop Songs) chart in 2012.

During 2012, a total of 19 singles hit number-one on the charts.

== Chart history ==
Key
†	Indicates best-performing single of 2012

Issue date	Song	Artist(s)	Ref.
January 7	"We Found Love"	Rihanna featuring Calvin Harris	
January 14	"We Found Love"	Rihanna featuring Calvin Harris	
January 21	"We Found Love"	Rihanna featuring Calvin Harris	
January 28	"We Found Love"	Rihanna featuring Calvin Harris	
February 4	"It Will Rain"	Bruno Mars	
February 11	"The One That Got Away"	Katy Perry	
February 18	"Good Feeling"	Flo Rida	
February 25	"Set Fire to the Rain"	Adele	
March 3	"Set Fire to the Rain"	Adele	
March 10	"Set Fire to the Rain"	Adele	
March 17	"Set Fire to the Rain"	Adele	
March 24	"Stronger (What Doesn't Kill You)"	Kelly Clarkson	
March 31	"Stronger (What Doesn't Kill You)"	Kelly Clarkson	
April 7	"Stronger (What Doesn't Kill You)"	Kelly Clarkson	
April 14	"Stronger (What Doesn't Kill You)"	Kelly Clarkson	
April 21	"Glad You Came"	The Wanted	
April 28	"We Are Young"	Fun featuring Janelle Monáe	
May 5	"We Are Young"	Fun featuring Janelle Monáe	
May 12	"We Are Young"	Fun featuring Janelle Monáe	
May 19	"We Are Young"	Fun featuring Janelle Monáe	
May 26	"We Are Young"	Fun featuring Janelle Monáe	
June 2	"Somebody That I Used to Know"	Gotye featuring Kimbra	
June 9	"Somebody That I Used to Know"	Gotye featuring Kimbra	
June 16	"Somebody That I Used to Know"	Gotye featuring Kimbra	
June 23	"Call Me Maybe"	Carly Rae Jepsen	
June 30	"Call Me Maybe"	Carly Rae Jepsen	
July 7	"Call Me Maybe"	Carly Rae Jepsen	
July 14	"Payphone"	Maroon 5 featuring Wiz Khalifa	
July 21	"Payphone"	Maroon 5 featuring Wiz Khalifa	
July 28	"Payphone"	Maroon 5 featuring Wiz Khalifa	
August 4	"Payphone"	Maroon 5 featuring Wiz Khalifa	
August 11	"Wide Awake"	Katy Perry	
August 18	"Wide Awake"	Katy Perry	
August 25	"Lights" †	Ellie Goulding	
September 1	"Wide Awake"	Katy Perry	
September 8	"Wide Awake"	Katy Perry	
September 15	"Give Your Heart a Break"	Demi Lovato	
September 22	"Whistle"	Flo Rida	
September 29	"Whistle"	Flo Rida	
October 6	"Blow Me (One Last Kiss)"	P!nk	
October 13	"One More Night"	Maroon 5	
October 20	"One More Night"	Maroon 5	
October 27	"One More Night"	Maroon 5	
November 3	"One More Night"	Maroon 5	
November 10	"One More Night"	Maroon 5	
November 17	"One More Night"	Maroon 5	
November 24	"One More Night"	Maroon 5	
December 1	"One More Night"	Maroon 5	
December 8	"Die Young"	Ke$ha	
December 15	"Die Young"	Ke$ha	
December 22	"Die Young"	Ke$ha	
December 29	"Locked Out of Heaven"	Bruno Mars	

== See also ==
- 2012 in music
