= Raise Your Glass =

2010 single by Pink

Single by Pink

from the album Greatest Hits... So Far!!!
- Released: October 5, 2010
- Studio: Woodshed (Malibu); Maratone (Stockholm)
- Genre: Pop rock
- Length: 3:23
- Label: LaFace
- Songwriters: Alecia Moore; Max Martin; Johan Schuster
- Producers: Max Martin; Shellback

Pink singles chronology
| "Glitter in the Air" (2010) | "Raise Your Glass" (2010) | "Fuckin' Perfect" (2010) |

Music video
- "Raise Your Glass" on YouTube

"Raise Your Glass" is a song recorded by American singer Pink for her first greatest hits album Greatest Hits... So Far!!! (2010). It was written by Pink along with frequent collaborators Max Martin and Karl "Shellback" Schuster. The song celebrates the first decade since Pink's debut in 2000, and is dedicated to her fans who have been supporting her over the years. It was released as the lead single from Greatest Hits... So Far!!! on October 5, 2010, by LaFace Records.

"Raise Your Glass" was released to both critical and commercial success, commended by most music critics and described as a party anthem, and reaching the top-ten in several countries, including the US, where it became Pink's third number-one single. In 2011, "Raise Your Glass" was ranked at number thirteen on the "Top 40 Year End Chart" based on Mediabase.

The song was featured in a commercial for the 2011 film Bridesmaids, and in the theatrical trailers for the films What's Your Number? and New Year's Eve. Selling Sunset star Chrishell Stause and Gleb Savchenko danced the tango to the song on the 29th season premiere of Dancing with the Stars.

== Background ==
"Raise Your Glass" was announced as the lead single from Pink's then-upcoming greatest hits compilation on October 1, 2010. The song follows a strong pop style, in much similar fashion to her previous work with producer Max Martin. Pink describes the song as a "celebration for people who feel left out from the popular crowd". In an interview for MTV, Pink comments on the song: "I don't know if it's going to be huge, but it is new. I did three new songs. It was good timing. I had been on the road for two years and I hadn't written anything and I wanted to write a song about underdogs. Instead of going and becoming a cover girl, I kind of just hit the road and pounded the pavement...and became a touring artist. You don't have to be popular when you're a touring artist, you just have to be good, and this is a thank you for the fans."

== Critical reception ==
"Raise Your Glass"
A 20-second sample of "Raise Your Glass". A review by the BBC lauded the track for its "silly one-liners" and "rampant abuse of the English language".

Nick Levine from Digital Spy was largely positive with the song, giving it 5/5 stars and describing it as "a full-throttle pop/rock stomper with a chorus as subtle as a porn star's cleavage, some classic Pink ad-libs and the best so-dumb-it's-genius couplet of the year: 'Don't be fancy / Just get dancey'... after ten years of sterling service to all things pop, the (pink) champagne's on us." Fraser McAlpine from BBC blog rated it 4/5 stars, saying that "it has to SOUND like wild and crazy fun. It should probably rock, or at least claim to rock. There must be a big celebratory chorus, something which brings everyone together in a glorious celebration of Brand Pink. There should be a few silly one-liners, rampant abuse of the English language, a few extravagant claims, a strutting self-regard mixed with a giggling self-depreciation, a sneer and a smile."

== Chart performance ==
In the United States, "Raise Your Glass" became Pink's third number one and her tenth top 10 hit on the Billboard Hot 100. It put Pink third on the list of female artists with most top 10 hits in the 2000s, behind Rihanna, who had collected 18 Top 10 hits since 2005 and Beyoncé, with 14. It took the song eight weeks to hit the Hot 100's apex, where it stayed for a single week. "Raise Your Glass" also became the singer's fifth chart topper on the Adult Pop Songs chart, giving her the most number ones on the chart of a female artist by then, and putting her in a tie with the band Nickelback for the most number ones on the chart out of all artists. "So What," Pink's only previous 3-million seller, reached that level in 26 weeks. By August 2013, "Raise Your Glass" had sold 4,162,000 copies. On July 10, 2017, it was certified 5× Platinum by the Recording Industry Association of America (RIAA).

In Australia, "Raise Your Glass" climbed to the top of the ARIA Singles Chart in only 24 hours. It also debuted atop the charts in Czech Republic, Hungary, and Poland. Elsewhere, it became a top five hit in Canada, the Netherlands, Finland, Germany, New Zealand, and Scotland and a top ten hit in Austria, Switzerland, Ireland, and on a composite European Hot 100 Singles chart. In the United Kingdom, "Raise Your Glass" peaked number 13 in the UK Singles Chart. It has since surpassed double Platinum status in the United Kingdom.

== Music video ==
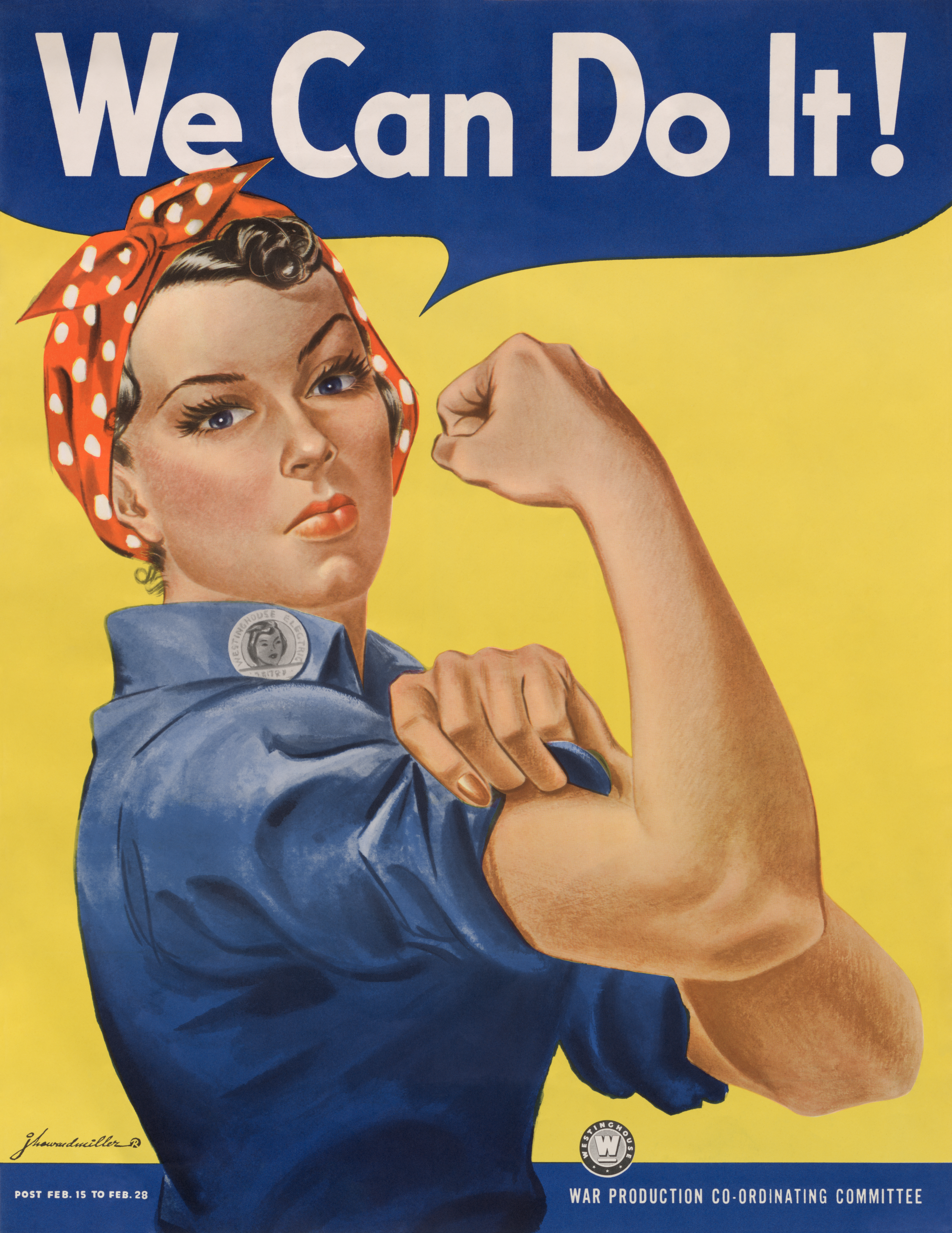
In several sequences in the video, Pink is shown depicting the Rosie the Riveter on the "We Can Do It!" poster (1943).

A music video for "Raise Your Glass" was filmed on October 4, 2010. It marked Pink's twelfth collaboration with director Dave Meyers. Based around one of Pink's real-life experiences, it features a celebration of gay marriage, expressing her views that people should not feel any differently towards gay marriage than straight marriage. Pink commented on the video in an interview for MTV News: "I threw my best friend's wedding in my backyard — she is lesbian and she married her wife, and it was absolutely beautiful. At the end of it, her mom said, 'Why can't this be legal?' and started crying. It was just the most heartbreaking thing I've ever seen, so that's why I'm doing it in my video." The video was released on Pink's official website on November 1, 2010. The music video was also the final music video that aired on 4Music before it ceased broadcasting on 30 June 2024, alongside other Channel 4-owned music channels.

== Live performances ==
"Raise Your Glass" serves as the opening song of The Truth About Love Tour. Pink performed the song live at American Music Awards of 2010 at Nokia Theatre in Los Angeles. It has also been added to Pink's Beautiful Trauma Tour, Pink Summer Carnival, and Trustfall Tour.

== Other versions ==
In 2011, the Maccabeats, an a cappella group from Yeshiva University, did a parody of the song called "Purim Song", referring to Jewish holiday Purim. "Purim Song" charted in the top 10 of Billboard's Comedy Digital Songs.

== Track listing ==
Digital/CD Single
| No. | Title | Writer(s) | Producer(s) | Length |
|---|---|---|---|---|
| 1. | "Raise Your Glass" | Alecia Moore; Max Martin; Johan Schuster | Max Martin; Shellback | 3:23 |
| 2. | "U + Ur Hand" (From Funhouse Tour: Live in Australia) | Moore; Martin; Lukasz Gottwald; Rami Yacoub | | 4:14 |

== Credits and personnel ==
Credits lifted from the liner notes of "Raise Your Glass."

- Songwriting – Pink, Max Martin, Shellback
- Production and recording – Max Martin, Shellback
- Keyboards – Max Martin
- Drums, guitar and bass – Shellback
- Gang vocals – Pink, Carey Hart, Max Martin, Shellback
- Assistant recording – Sal "El Rey" Ojeda
- Additional recording – Michael Ilbert
- Mixing – Serban Ghenea
- Mix engineer – John Hanes
- Assistant mix engineer – Tim Roberts

== Charts ==
=== Weekly charts ===
Weekly chart performance for "Raise Your Glass"
| Chart (2010–2011) | Peak position |
|---|---|
| Australia (ARIA) | 1 |
| Austria (Ö3 Austria Top 40) | 9 |
| Belgium (Ultratop 50 Flanders) | 20 |
| Belgium (Ultratop 50 Wallonia) | 29 |
| Canada Hot 100 (Billboard) | 2 |
| CIS Airplay (TopHit) | 100 |
| Croatia International Airplay (HRT) | 4 |
| Czech Republic Airplay (ČNS IFPI) | 1 |
| Denmark (Tracklisten) | 12 |
| Finland (Suomen virallinen lista) | 5 |
| France (SNEP) | 37 |
| France Download (SNEP) | 18 |
| Germany (GfK) | 5 |
| Hungary (Rádiós Top 40) | 1 |
| Ireland (IRMA) | 10 |
| Italy (FIMI) | 30 |
| Mexico Anglo (Monitor Latino) | 9 |
| Netherlands (Dutch Top 40) | 4 |
| Netherlands (Single Top 100) | 3 |
| New Zealand (Recorded Music NZ) | 5 |
| Norway (VG-lista) | 14 |
| Poland (Polish Airplay New) | 1 |
| Romania Airplay (România liberă) | 27 |
| Scottish Singles Sales (Official Charts) | 5 |
| Slovakia Airplay (ČNS IFPI) | 17 |
| Sweden (Sverigetopplistan) | 15 |
| Switzerland (Schweizer Hitparade) | 9 |
| UK Singles (Official Charts) | 13 |
| US Billboard Hot 100 | 1 |
| US Adult Contemporary (Billboard) | 9 |
| US Adult Pop Airplay (Billboard) | 1 |
| US Dance Club Songs (Billboard) | 17 |
| US Dance Airplay (Billboard) | 1 |
| US Pop Airplay (Billboard) | 1 |
| US Rhythmic Airplay (Billboard) | 20 |

=== Year-end charts ===
2010 year-end chart performance for "Raise Your Glass"
| Chart (2010) | Position |
|---|---|
| Australia (ARIA) | 17 |
| Canada (Canadian Hot 100) | 73 |
| Germany (Official German Charts) | 61 |
| Hungary (Rádiós Top 40) | 74 |
| Netherlands (Dutch Top 40) | 49 |
| New Zealand (RMNZ) | 40 |
| UK Singles (OCC) | 126 |

2011 year-end chart performance for "Raise Your Glass"
| Chart (2011) | Position |
|---|---|
| Australia (ARIA) | 86 |
| Brazil (Crowley) | 79 |
| Canada (Canadian Hot 100) | 18 |
| Croatia International Airplay (HRT) | 62 |
| Hungary (Rádiós Top 40) | 3 |
| Netherlands (Single Top 100) | 90 |
| US Billboard Hot 100 | 17 |
| US Adult Contemporary (Billboard) | 19 |
| US Adult Top 40 (Billboard) | 5 |
| US Dance/Mix Show Airplay (Billboard) | 20 |
| US Mainstream Top 40 (Billboard) | 19 |

== Certifications ==
Certifications and sales for "Raise Your Glass"
| Region | Certification | Certified units/sales |
|---|---|---|
| Australia (ARIA) | 10× Platinum | 700,000^{‡} |
| Brazil (Pro-Música Brasil) | Platinum | 60,000^{‡} |
| Canada (Music Canada) | 4× Platinum | 320,000^{*} |
| Denmark (IFPI Danmark) | Platinum | 90,000^{‡} |
| Denmark (IFPI Danmark) | Gold | 50,000^{†} |
| Germany (BVMI) | Gold | 150,000^{^} |
| Italy (FIMI) | Gold | 15,000^{*} |
| Mexico (AMPROFON) | Platinum | 60,000^{‡} |
| New Zealand (RMNZ) | 5× Platinum | 150,000^{‡} |
| Sweden (GLF) | Gold | 20,000^{‡} |
| Switzerland (IFPI Switzerland) | Gold | 15,000^{^} |
| United Kingdom (BPI) | 2× Platinum | 1,200,000^{‡} |
| United States (RIAA) | 5× Platinum | 5,000,000^{‡} |
^{*} Sales figures based on certification alone.^{^} Shipments figures based on certification alone.^{‡} Sales+streaming figures based on certification alone.^{†} Streaming-only figures based on certification alone.

== Release history ==
Release dates and formats for "Raise Your Glass"
| Region | Date | Format(s) | Label(s) | Ref. |
|---|---|---|---|---|
| Worldwide | October 5, 2010 | Digital download; radio airplay; streaming | LaFace | |
| Germany | October 29, 2010 | Digital download | Sony Music | |
| Germany | November 5, 2010 | CD | Sony Music | |
| United Kingdom | November 8, 2010 | Digital download | RCA | |

== See also ==
- List of highest-certified singles in Australia
