= Never Gonna Not Dance Again =

2022 single by Pink

Single by Pink

from the album Trustfall
- Released: November 4, 2022
- Studio: BLND Studios (Stockholm, Sweden); House Mouse Studios (Stockholm, Sweden); Kallbacken Studios (Stockholm, Sweden); MXM Studios (Los Angeles, California)
- Genre: Pop; disco; soul
- Length: 3:45
- Label: RCA
- Songwriters: Alecia Moore; Max Martin; Shellback
- Producers: Max Martin; Shellback

Pink singles chronology
| "Irrelevant" (2022) | "Never Gonna Not Dance Again" (2022) | "Trustfall" (2023) |

Music video
- "Never Gonna Not Dance Again" on YouTube

"Never Gonna Not Dance Again" is a song by American singer Pink. It was released on November 4, 2022, as the lead single from her ninth studio album Trustfall. The song reached the top 50 in several countries while peaking at number 99 on the Billboard Hot 100.

== Background and release ==
On October 6, 2022, Pink announced that she would be touring in Europe as part of her Summer Carnival Tour in 2023. On October 17, 2022, two weeks before the song's release, Pink teased the song and released a snippet on social media. The song became available to stream on Apple Music and Spotify on November 4, 2022.

== Composition ==
The song was described as "an upbeat anthem about dancing through our perpetually hard times". An associated press release called the track "vibrant, joyful and euphoric".

In an interview on U.S. morning television program Good Morning America, Pink said that the song reflected her desire to just find happiness, saying "you can take everything I have, but you can't take my joy." In the same interview, she noted that insecurities should not limit people from doing what they want.

== Music video ==
The music video was released on YouTube the same day. The singer is seen wearing a colourful outfit and roller skating in a grocery store and a parking lot. At the end, the former transforms into a nightclub. The video also features child actress Scarlett Spears.

== Charts ==
=== Weekly charts ===
Weekly chart performance for "Never Gonna Not Dance Again"
| Chart (2022–23) | Peak position |
|---|---|
| Australia (ARIA) | 64 |
| Austria (Ö3 Austria Top 40) | 53 |
| Belgium (Ultratop 50 Flanders) | 4 |
| Belgium (Ultratop 50 Wallonia) | 6 |
| Canada Hot 100 (Billboard) | 29 |
| Canada AC (Billboard) | 2 |
| Canada CHR/Top 40 (Billboard) | 34 |
| Canada Hot AC (Billboard) | 6 |
| CIS Airplay (TopHit) | 87 |
| Croatia Airplay (HRT) | 2 |
| Denmark Airplay (Tracklisten) | 1 |
| Finland Airplay (Radiosoittolista) | 12 |
| France Airplay (SNEP) | 15 |
| Germany (GfK) | 86 |
| Hungary (Rádiós Top 40) | 14 |
| Hungary (Single Top 40) | 10 |
| Iceland (Tónlistinn) | 20 |
| Ireland (IRMA) | 31 |
| Japan Hot Overseas (Billboard Japan) | 6 |
| Latvia Airplay (LAIPA) | 10 |
| Netherlands (Dutch Top 40) | 12 |
| Netherlands (Single Top 100) | 50 |
| New Zealand Hot Singles (RMNZ) | 9 |
| Poland (Polish Airplay Top 100) | 12 |
| Slovakia Airplay (ČNS IFPI) | 21 |
| Suriname (Nationale Top 40) | 2 |
| Sweden Heatseeker (Sverigetopplistan) | 13 |
| Switzerland (Schweizer Hitparade) | 58 |
| UK Singles (Official Charts) | 19 |
| US Billboard Hot 100 | 99 |
| US Adult Contemporary (Billboard) | 9 |
| US Adult Pop Airplay (Billboard) | 6 |
| US Pop Airplay (Billboard) | 21 |
| Venezuela (Record Report) | 50 |

=== Year-end charts ===
2022 year-end chart performance for "Never Gonna Not Dance Again"
| Chart (2022) | Position |
|---|---|
| Belgium (Ultratop 50 Flanders) | 163 |
| Netherlands (Dutch Top 40) | 95 |

2023 year-end chart performance for "Never Gonna Not Dance Again"
| Chart (2023) | Position |
|---|---|
| Belgium (Ultratop 50 Flanders) | 34 |
| Belgium (Ultratop 50 Wallonia) | 46 |
| Canada (Canadian Hot 100) | 72 |
| Netherlands (Dutch Top 40) | 82 |
| US Adult Contemporary (Billboard) | 23 |
| US Adult Top 40 (Billboard) | 23 |

== Certifications ==
Certifications for "Never Gonna Not Dance Again"
| Region | Certification | Certified units/sales |
|---|---|---|
| Australia (ARIA) | Gold | 35,000^{‡} |
| Belgium (BRMA) | Gold | 20,000^{‡} |
| Canada (Music Canada) | Platinum | 80,000^{‡} |
| Denmark (IFPI Danmark) | Gold | 45,000^{‡} |
| New Zealand (RMNZ) | Gold | 15,000^{‡} |
| Switzerland (IFPI Switzerland) | Gold | 10,000^{‡} |
| United Kingdom (BPI) | Gold | 400,000^{‡} |
^{‡} Sales+streaming figures based on certification alone.

== Release history ==
Release dates and formats for "Never Gonna Not Dance Again"
| Region | Date | Format | Version | Label | Ref. |
|---|---|---|---|---|---|
| Various | November 4, 2022 | Digital download; streaming | Original | RCA | |
| Italy | November 11, 2022 | Radio airplay | Original | Sony | |
| Various | December 13, 2022 | Digital download; streaming | Sam Feldt remix | RCA | |
| United States | January 10, 2023 | Contemporary hit radio | Original | RCA | |
| Canada | April 19, 2023 | Radio arplay | Original | RCA | |
