= Trustfall =

- Standard cover

Studio album by Pink
- Released: February 17, 2023
- Genre: Pop
- Length: 43:37
- Label: RCA
- Producers: A Strut; Afterhrs; Fred Again; Jason Evigan; Jeremiah Fraites; Teddy Geiger; Simon Gooding; Harloe; David Hodges; Sam de Jong; Matthew Koma; Greg Kurstin; Billy Mann; Nate Mercereau; Max Martin; Johnny McDaid; Pink; Wesley Schultz; Jesse Shatkin; Shellback

Pink chronology
All I Know So Far: Setlist (2021)	Trustfall (2023)

Singles from Trustfall
- 1. "Never Gonna Not Dance Again" Released: November 4, 2022; 2. "Trustfall" Released: January 27, 2023; 3. "When I Get There" Released: February 14, 2023; 4. "Runaway" Released: July 7, 2023

Trustfall is the ninth studio album by American singer Pink. It was released on February 17, 2023, through RCA Records. Following her 2019 album Hurts 2B Human, the record was shaped by a period of touring, collaborations, and personal reflection, with Pink describing its sequencing and title as central to conveying everyday uncertainty, emotional risk, and trust in relationships and life experiences.

Trustfall is a pop album that blends variety of genres such as dance-pop, folk, and Americana influences, as it moves between upbeat, synth-driven tracks and piano-led ballads. Lyrically, it address themes such as self-acceptance and personal growth. The album was supported by the singles "Never Gonna Not Dance Again", "Trustfall", "When I Get There" and "Runaway" as well as promoted through television appearances, festival performances, and subsequent touring.

Upon release, Trustfall received generally favorable reviews from critics, who highlighted its emotional focus, introspective songwriting, and vocal performances, while some noted stylistic familiarity and uneven execution. Commercially, the album achieved international success, as it debuted at number one in several countries including the United Kingdom, Australia, and Scotland, and reached number two on the US Billboard 200, alongside earning multiple gold and platinum certifications worldwide.

== Background ==
After the publication of her eighth studio album Hurts 2B Human in 2019, Pink collaborated on "One Too Many" (2020) with Keith Urban and "Anywhere Away from Here" (2021) with Rag'n'Bone Man. On May 21, 2021, the singer released All I Know So Far, a documentary chronicling Pink on her record-breaking Beautiful Trauma World Tour. The project was promoted by two new original songs "Cover Me in Sunshine" and "All I Know So Far", as well as a live album. During a 2021 interview, promoting the documentary, Pink was questioned about her next studio album; when asked about the tone of the album, she replied saying she was not sure as it was in the "early days" but that it would be "very honest." On July 14, 2022, Pink surprise released her first single since 2021, "Irrelevant", as a protest song in response to her outrage with the overrule of Roe v. Wade by the U.S. Supreme Court. From May to October 2022, Pink headlined at BottleRock Napa Valley, Ohana Festival, and Austin City Limits, while also performing a show at Yaamava Theater in Southern California. She also played at the second Taylor Hawkins Tribute Concert in Los Angeles and Foo Fighters' The Hanukkah Sessions.

Pink stated that the sequencing of Trustfall was "really important" to her during its creation, emphasizing the album's intended experience when listened to from beginning to end. According to her, the record was designed to move fluidly between contrasting emotional states, as it mirrors what she viewed as the disorderly yet meaningful nature of everyday life. The singer also explained that the album's title emerged easily from these ideas, as she associated the concept of "trust" with ordinary responsibilities and social participation, such as relationships, parenting, and civic engagement. Pink likened these experiences to a sensation of uncertainty; noting that people often feel as though they are "falling backwards" without knowing where they will land.

== Composition and production ==
Trustfall is a pop album that incorporates elements of various genres, namely dance-pop, Americana, and folk. According to Michael Cragg of The Guardian, the album is built around a combination of "rustic ballads, pogoing guitar stomps, and pepped-up pop anthems". Lyrically, Trustfall contains themes of self-motivation, self-acceptance, and afterlife. In addition, as noted by Consequence, the record places a pronounced emphasis on storytelling and introspection, as it doesn't let listeners waste their time to recognize the album's "personal nature". It also moves between contrasting musical approaches: USA Today characterized it as stylistically diverse, pairing dance-pop songs with a rock edge, such as "Never Gonna Not Dance Again" and "Runaway", with more introspective ballads, namely "When I Get There" and "Long Way to Go", a range that Pink associated with "the roller coaster of life". However, Trustfall juxtaposes differing stylistic influences, as it cites the coexistence of frenetic, pop-punk-leaning material alongside "characterless" dance-oriented tracks.

=== Music and lyrics ===
"Trustfall"
The 25-second sample of "Trustfall". It centers on its "driving EDM beat" and a sense of pushing "beyond your fears" in the chorus.

On "When I Get There", Pink mourns her late father with "tender vulnerability", supported by contemplative piano and string arrangements, while also functioning as a grief anthem "intensely reminiscent" of her I'm Not Dead (2006) and Funhouse (2008) eras. The title track, "Trustfall", "picks up the pace with its pulsating synths", unfolding over EDM production and reinforcing the album's theme of "low-level trauma", as framed by lines such as "Close your eyes and leave it all behind". "Turbulence" is framed around a disco rhythm, accompanied by a video built on playful, exaggerated imagery. On "Long Way to Go", Wesley Schultz of the Lumineers shares lead vocals with Pink, featuring moody piano chords and military drums. "Kids in Love" is noted for its nostalgic and emotional tone, as it aligns with the album's reflective focus on relationships and maturity. "Never Gonna Not Dance Again" is a dance-pop song built on a bright disco-oriented beat, noted to depend largely on the listener's "sugar tolerance".

"Runaway" is a subdued track, where even an added layer of 1980s-influenced synths fails to significantly alter its restrained impact. "Last Call" stands out as a midtempo track that "laughs the pain away" through bittersweet twang and a swelling chorus. "Hate Me" places Pink in the role of the villain, articulated through confrontational lines like "I'm not your bitch / Wanna light me up like an evil witch", and contributes to what has been described as a full-circle moment for her. "Lost Cause", drawing comparison to Adele, expands a similar piano-and-strings foundation, enhanced by "dramatic choral harmonies". On "Feel Something", Pink delivers a "poignant examination" of adulthood and emotional uncertainty, as she asks, "Wouldn't you think by now I'd be ready?". The piano ballad "Our Song" is described as "stirring", nostalgic and emotional tone which delivers a "powerful gut-punch" through a show-stopping vocal performance. "Just Say I'm Sorry", the closing track featuring Chris Stapleton, is described as feeling "overwrought" when compared to their 2019 duet "Love Me Anyway".

== Release and promotion ==
On October 17, 2022, Pink teased the then-upcoming album's lead single, "Never Gonna Not Dance Again", alongside the song's snippet. The song, produced by Max Martin and Shellback, became available for streaming on November 4, along with an accompanying music video. On November 14, Pink announced that she would be touring in the United Kingdom and Europe as part of her Pink Summer Carnival Tour in 2023. Four days later, she announced Trustfall on American television program Good Morning America and the album's release date. On November 20, she performed "Never Gonna Not Dance Again" live for the first time at the American Music Awards.

On January 27, 2023, the second single and title track, "Trustfall" was released alongside the music video directed by Georgia Hudson. On February 2, Pink revealed the album's tracklist which features the guest appearances from First Aid Kit, Chris Stapleton, and the Lumineers. On February 6, she appeared on singer Kelly Clarkson's daytime television variety talk show The Kelly Clarkson Show. On February 14, Pink released the album's third single, "When I Get There", written by Amy Wadge and David Hodges in honor of Pink's late father, Jim Moore, who passed in August 2021. Three days later, the album Trustfall was released. The fourth single, "Runaway", was sent to radio station in Australia and Germany, on July 7. During the North American leg of her Summer Carnival Tour in July 2023, Pink performed a tribute to Sinéad O'Connor by welcoming Brandi Carlile onstage to sing "Nothing Compares 2 U" at a concert held at Great American Ball Park in Cincinnati, Ohio. On October 13, Pink announced the release of a deluxe edition of Trustfall, which includes her past-year-single "Irrelevant", two new songs and six live recordings from the Summer Carnival Tour. On December 1, the edition was released for digital download, LP and CD purchase. She also announced the Trustfall Tour between October and November 2023 in United States as break of the Summer Carnival Tour, which would be extended to Australia in 2024.

== Critical reception ==
Professional ratings
Aggregate scores
Source	Rating
AnyDecentMusic?	6.3/10
Metacritic	71/100
Review scores
Source	Rating
AllMusic	4/5 stars
Evening Standard	3/5 stars
The Guardian	3/5 stars
The Independent	3/5 stars
The Line of Best Fit	5/10
MusicOMH	3/5 stars
PopMatters	8/10
The Telegraph	3/5 stars
The Times	4/5 stars
Tom Hull – on the Web	B+

Upon release, Trustfall was met with a positive response from music critics. At Metacritic, which assigns a normalised rating out of 100 based on reviews from mainstream critics, the album received a score of 71 out of 100, based on reviews from nine critics, indicating "generally favorable reviews".

Several publications highlighted the album's emotional focus and continuity within Pink's career. Neil Z. Yeung from AllMusic described Trustfall as a "cathartic" release that centers on themes of change, self-acceptance, and resilience, and praised her vocal performance and the album's motivational tone. Rolling Stone editor Maura Johnston interpreted the title as a metaphor for emotional reliance, noting that Pink applies her raspy vocal style across genres while delivering lyrics that feel "genuine", even when written in collaboration. Jeffrey Davies of PopMatters characterized the record as her "most vulnerable" work in years, emphasizing its reflective nature and perceived sincerity. Consequence's Cady Siregar also emphasized its personal dimension, noting that the album places her "sensitive side front and center" and blends a pop foundation with singer-songwriter elements, including piano-driven ballads and folk-leaning collaborations. John Murphy from MusicOMH described the album as Pink's "most personal" to date, pointing to its engagement with grief and family experiences, and highlighted tracks such as the piano-led "When I Get There" as emotionally resonant, while also noting that the album takes relatively few stylistic risks.

Other reviews focused on stylistic familiarity or uneven execution. The Guardian author Michael Cragg noted that while Trustfall contains "pleasing tangents", such as the Robyn-like title track and the country-inflected "Last Call", much of the album adheres to established patterns, which results in what it described as "business as usual". The Independent's Roisin O'Connor argued that the record "falls short", citing a lack of cohesion caused by competing influences and criticizing its reliance on collaborations compared to earlier phases of her career. Sam Franzini of The Line of Best Fit stated that the album lacks defining songs, claiming there are "no hits" that distinguish it within her discography, and suggested that the material does not reflect the artistic distinctiveness present in her earlier work.

== Commercial performance ==
Trustfall debuted at number one on the UK Albums Chart. Over 65% of its total made up of physical sales, becoming Pink's fourth album and her third consecutive to do so, following Beautiful Trauma (2017) and Hurts 2B Human (2019). It also peaked at number one on the UK Download Chart and Sales Chart. In Scotland and Australia, the album debuted at number one on the Scottish Albums Chart and Australian Albums Chart, the latter becoming her seventh number-one album in the country. In the United States, Trustfall debuted at number two on the Billboard 200 with 74,500 album-equivalent units, of which 59,000 were pure album sales.

== Track listing ==
Standard edition
No.	Title	Writer(s)	Producer(s)	Length
1.	"When I Get There"	Amy Wadge; David Hodges	Hodges	3:20
2.	"Trustfall"	Alecia Moore; Johnny McDaid; Fred Gibson	McDaid; Fred; Graham Archer^{[v]}	3:57
3.	"Turbulence"	Matthew Koma; Madison Love	Koma	3:26
4.	"Long Way to Go" (featuring The Lumineers)	Moore; Jeremiah Fraites; Jesse Shatkin; John Stephen Sudduth; Maureen "Mozella" McDonald; Wesley Schultz	Moore; Fraites; Shatkin; Schultz; Simon Gooding; David Baron^{[a]}	3:09
5.	"Kids in Love" (featuring First Aid Kit)	Ludvig Söderberg; Jakob Jerlström; Klara Söderberg	A Strut	2:47
6.	"Never Gonna Not Dance Again"	Moore; Max Martin; Shellback	Martin; Shellback	3:44
7.	"Runaway"	Edvard Erfjord; Clementine Douglas	Greg Kurstin	2:42
8.	"Last Call"	Moore; Billy Mann; Pete Wallace	Mann; Wallace^{[c]}	4:03
9.	"Hate Me"	Moore; Kurstin	Kurstin	3:20
10.	"Lost Cause"	Wrabel; Sam de Jong; Sam Romans	Pink; de Jong	3:38
11.	"Feel Something"	Teddy Geiger; Ian Franzino; Jason Evigan; Nate Mercereau	Geiger; Evigan; Mercereau; Afterhrs	3:04
12.	"Our Song"	Shatkin; Jessica Karpov; McDonald	Shatkin; Harloe	2:54
13.	"Just Say I'm Sorry" (featuring Chris Stapleton)	Moore; Chris Stapleton	Kurstin	3:33
Total length:				43:37

Japanese edition
No.	Title	Writer(s)	Producer(s)	Length
14.	"Never Gonna Not Dance Again" (Sam Feldt remix)	Moore; Martin; Shellback	Martin; Shellback; Sam Feldt^{[a]}	2:47
Total length:				46:24

Tour deluxe edition (disc 2)
No.	Title	Writer(s)	Producer(s)	Length
1.	"Dreaming" (featuring Sting and Marshmello)	Sting; Marshmello; Digital Farm Animals; Richard Boardman; Kiddo A.I.	Marshmello; Digital Farm Animals	2:50
2.	"Irrelevant"	Moore; Ian Fitchuk	Fitchuk	3:52
3.	"All Out of Fight"	Johnny McDaid; Moore; Fred Gibson	Fred; McDaid	3:32
4.	"Just Like Fire" / "Heartbreaker" (live)	Moore; Martin; Schuster; Oscar Holter; Kara DioGuardi; Greg Wells / Geoff Gill; Cliff Wade		5:29
5.	"When I Get There" (live)	Wadge; Hodges		3:32
6.	"Nothing Compares 2 U" (with Brandi Carlile; live)	Prince		5:05
7.	"No Ordinary Love" (live)	Sade Adu; Stuart Matthewman		3:42
8.	"Cover Me in Sunshine" (featuring Willow Sage Hart; live)	Amy Allen; Maureen "Mozella" McDonald		2:51
9.	"What About Us" (live)	Moore; Johnny McDaid; Steve Mac		4:20
Total length:				79:04

=== Notes ===
- ^{^[c]} signifies co-producer.
- ^{^[a]} signifies additional producer.
- ^{^[v]} signifies vocal producer.

== Personnel ==
=== Musicians ===
- Pink – lead vocals (all tracks), background vocals (tracks 1, 2, 5, 8)
- David Hodges – background vocals, guitar, piano, programming (1)
- Fred – background vocals, bass guitar, drums, guitar, keyboards, programming (2)
- Johnny McDaid – background vocals (2)
- Byron Isaacs – background vocals, bass guitar (4)
- James Felice – background vocals (4)
- David Baron – bass guitar (4)
- Jeremiah Fraites – drums, electric guitar, percussion, piano, synthesizer (4)
- Wesley Schultz – vocals (4)
- A Strut – background vocals, drums, programming (5)
- Elvira Anderfjärd – background vocals (5)
- Klara Söderberg – background vocals, guitar (5)
- Johanna Söderberg – background vocals (5)
- Fat Max Gsus – bass guitar (5)
- Max Martin – background vocals, keyboards, programming (6)
- Shellback – background vocals, bass guitar, drums, guitar, keyboards, percussion, programming (6)
- Wojtek Goral – alto saxophone (6)
- Tomas Jonsson – baritone saxophone, tenor saxophone (6)
- David Bukovinszky – cello (6)
- Helena Stjernstrom – English horn (6)
- Mattias Bylund – orchestra, synthesizer (6)
- Magnus Sjölander – percussion (6)
- Peter Noos Johansson – trombone (6)
- Janne Bjerger – trumpet (6)
- Magnus Johansson – trumpet (6)
- Mattias Johansson – violin (6)
- Doris Sandberg – vocals (6)
- Jameson Moon Hart – vocals (6)
- Willow Sage Hart – vocals (6)
- Laura Mace – background vocals (7)
- Maize Jane Olinger – background vocals (7)
- Greg Kurstin – bass guitar, drums, electric guitar, keyboards, percussion, synthesizer (7, 9)
- Billy Mann – acoustic guitar, arrangement, background vocals, bass guitar, programming (8)
- Pete Wallace – arrangement, programming (8)
- Aaron Sterling – drums (8)
- Justin Derrico – electric guitar, mandolin (8); guitar (13)
- Stephen Wrabel – background vocals, piano (10)
- Sam de Jong – programming, strings (10)
- Jason Evigan – background vocals, guitar (11)
- Nate Mercereau – guitar (11)
- Jessica Karpov – piano (12)
- John Ormond – bass guitar (13)
- Chris Stapleton – electric guitar, vocals (13)

=== Technical ===
- Randy Merrill – mastering (1, 3–5, 7–13)
- Dave Kutch – mastering (2, 6)
- Mark "Spike" Stent – mixing (1, 3, 8–10, 12, 13)
- Serban Ghenea – mixing (2, 4–7, 11)
- David Hodges – engineering (1)
- Bryce Bordone – engineering (2, 4–7, 11)
- Fred – engineering (2)
- Graham Archer – engineering (2)
- Johnny McDaid – engineering (2)
- David Baron – engineering (4)
- Lasse Mårtén – engineering (6)
- Sam Holland – engineering (6)
- Mattias Byland – engineering (6)
- Greg Kurstin – engineering (7, 9, 13)
- Julian Burg – engineering (7, 9, 13)
- Matt Tuggle – engineering (7, 9, 13)
- Aaron Sterling – engineering (8)
- Billy Mann – engineering (8)
- Justin Derrico – engineering (8)
- Pete Wallace – engineering (8)
- Jesse Shatkin – engineering (12)
- Vance Powell – engineering (13)
- Matt Wolach – engineering assistance (1, 3, 8–10, 12, 13)
- Will Reynolds – engineering assistance (2)
- Renée Hikari – engineering assistance (3)

== Charts ==
=== Weekly charts ===
Chart (2023)	Peak position
Australian Albums (ARIA)	1
Austrian Albums (Ö3 Austria)	1
Belgian Albums (Ultratop Flanders)	2
Belgian Albums (Ultratop Wallonia)	2
Canadian Albums (Billboard)	1
Czech Albums (ČNS IFPI)	10
Danish Albums (Hitlisten)	24
Dutch Albums (Album Top 100)	2
Finnish Albums (Suomen virallinen lista)	14
French Albums (SNEP)	2
German Albums (Offizielle Top 100)	1
Greek Albums (IFPI)	70
Hungarian Albums (MAHASZ)	7
Irish Albums (Official Charts)	2
Italian Albums (FIMI)	62
Japanese Digital Albums (Oricon)	15
Japanese Hot Albums (Billboard Japan)	38
Lithuanian Albums (AGATA)	43
New Zealand Albums (RMNZ)	1
Norwegian Albums (VG-lista)	3
Polish Albums (ZPAV)	8
Portuguese Albums (AFP)	4
Scottish Albums (Official Charts)	1
Slovak Albums (ČNS IFPI)	36
Spanish Albums (Promusicae)	9
Swedish Albums (Sverigetopplistan)	6
Swiss Albums (Schweizer Hitparade)	1
UK Albums (Official Charts)	1
US Billboard 200	2

=== Year-end charts ===
Chart (2023)	Position
Australian Albums (ARIA)	16
Austrian Albums (Ö3 Austria)	27
Belgian Albums (Ultratop Flanders)	23
Belgian Albums (Ultratop Wallonia)	88
Dutch Albums (Album Top 100)	48
French Albums (SNEP)	77
German Albums (Offizielle Top 100)	19
Swiss Albums (Schweizer Hitparade)	25
UK Albums (OCC)	29

Chart (2024)	Position
Australian Albums (ARIA)	83
Belgian Albums (Ultratop Flanders)	128
French Albums (SNEP)	138

== Certifications ==
Region	Certification	Certified units/sales
Australia (ARIA)	Gold	35,000^{‡}
Belgium (BRMA)	Gold	10,000^{‡}
France (SNEP)	Gold	50,000^{‡}
Germany (BVMI)	Gold	100,000^{‡}
New Zealand (RMNZ)	Platinum	15,000^{‡}
Poland (ZPAV)	Gold	10,000^{‡}
Switzerland (IFPI Switzerland)	Gold	10,000^{‡}
United Kingdom (BPI)	Gold	100,000^{‡}
^{‡} Sales+streaming figures based on certification alone.

== Release history ==
Region	Date	Format(s)	Editions	Label	Ref.
Various	February 17, 2023	CD; digital download; streaming; vinyl	Standard	RCA	
Various	December 1, 2023	CD; digital download; streaming; vinyl	Tour deluxe	RCA	
