= Irrelevant (song) =

2022 song by Pink

Single by Pink

from the album Trustfall (Tour Deluxe Edition)
- Released: July 14, 2022
- Recorded: June–July 2022
- Genre: Pop punk; pop rock
- Length: 3:52
- Label: RCA
- Songwriters: Alecia Beth Moore; Ian Fitchuk
- Producer: Fitchuk

Pink singles chronology
"All I Know So Far" (2021)	"Irrelevant" (2022)	"Never Gonna Not Dance Again" (2022)

Music video
- "Irrelevant" on YouTube

"Irrelevant" is a protest song by American singer-songwriter Pink. It was written by the singer and the track's producer Ian Fitchuk. A pop punk and pop rock song, it features lyrics advocating for fighting over one's rights and touching on trolls, hypocrites, bad political decisions, and the continued fight for women's rights. Additionally she references Cyndi Lauper's "Girls Just Want to Have Fun" (1983) and the Who's "The Kids Are Alright" (1965). The song was highly inspired by the overrule of Roe v. Wade by the U.S. Supreme Court, as well as hate and troll comments Pink received after she voiced her opinion about the issue. It was praised by music critics, who named the track a "protest anthem". An accompanying music video, directed by the singer and Brad Comfort, was released on July 18. "Irrelevant" was later included on the Deluxe Tour Edition of Pink's ninth studio album, Trustfall.

== Background and release ==
On June 24, 2022, the U.S. Supreme Court overturned Roe v. Wade in a landmark decision Dobbs v. Jackson Women's Health Organization, returning the power to define abortion rights or restrictions to the states. The following day, Pink voiced her opinion on Twitter, writing that the people who oppose Roe v. Wade should not listen to her music and instructed them to "fuck right off". The tweet divided the audiences, and generated various hate and troll comments towards the singer, which she was responding to. On July 3, she posted a picture of a microphone in her house with a caption "When they tell you to 'shut up and sing'.... Okay then." On July 12, the singer shared a video where she croons the chorus of "Irrelevant" a cappella. The next day, a photo of a napkin with the song's lyrics appeared on her social media, with a caption "Woke up. Got heated. Wrote song. Coming soon."

"Irrelevant" was released without any prior announcement on July 14 at 12 AM Eastern Time through RCA Records for digital download and streaming. According to Billboard, all of the song's proceeds will be donated to Michelle Obama's nonpartisan voting initiative "When We All Vote". Alongside the release, Pink revealed the cover which is a "blurry snap" depicting her giving the finger; Billboard's Gil Kaufman opined that it matches the song's message. She also posted a statement about the track:

"As a woman with an opinion and the fearlessness to voice that opinion, it gets very tiring when the only retort is to tell me how irrelevant I am. I am relevant because I exist, and because I am a human being. No one is irrelevant. And no one can take away my voice."

== Composition and reception ==
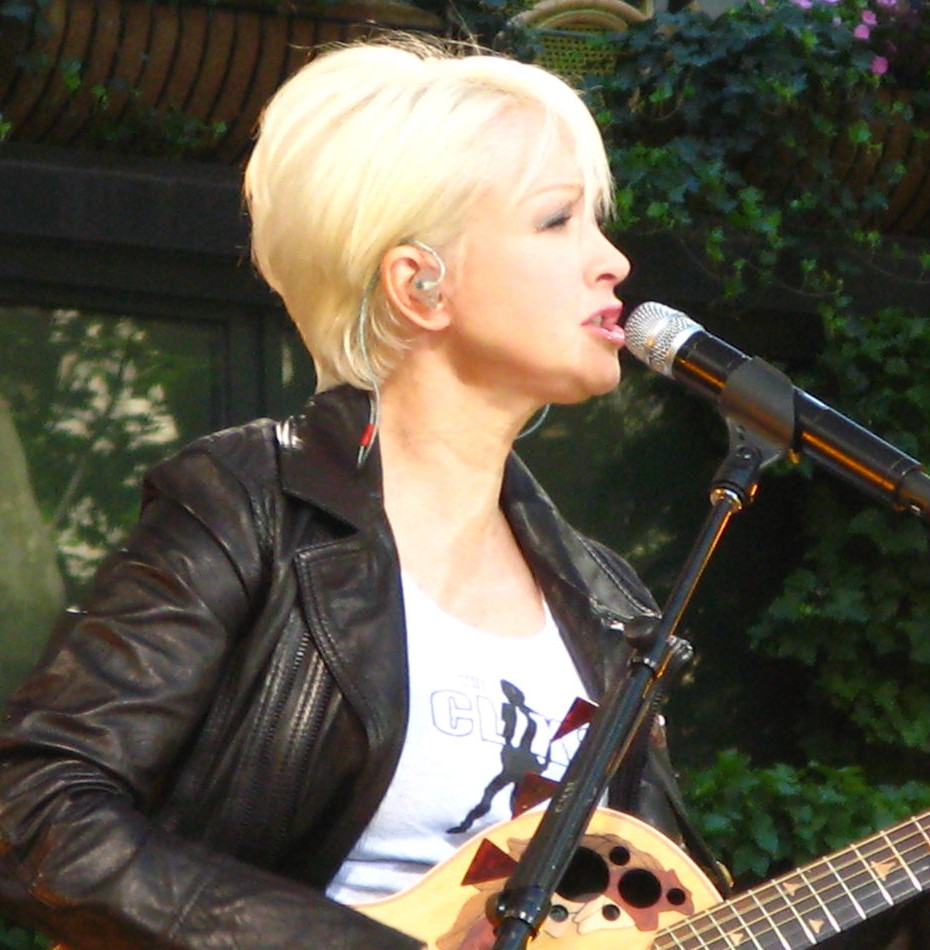
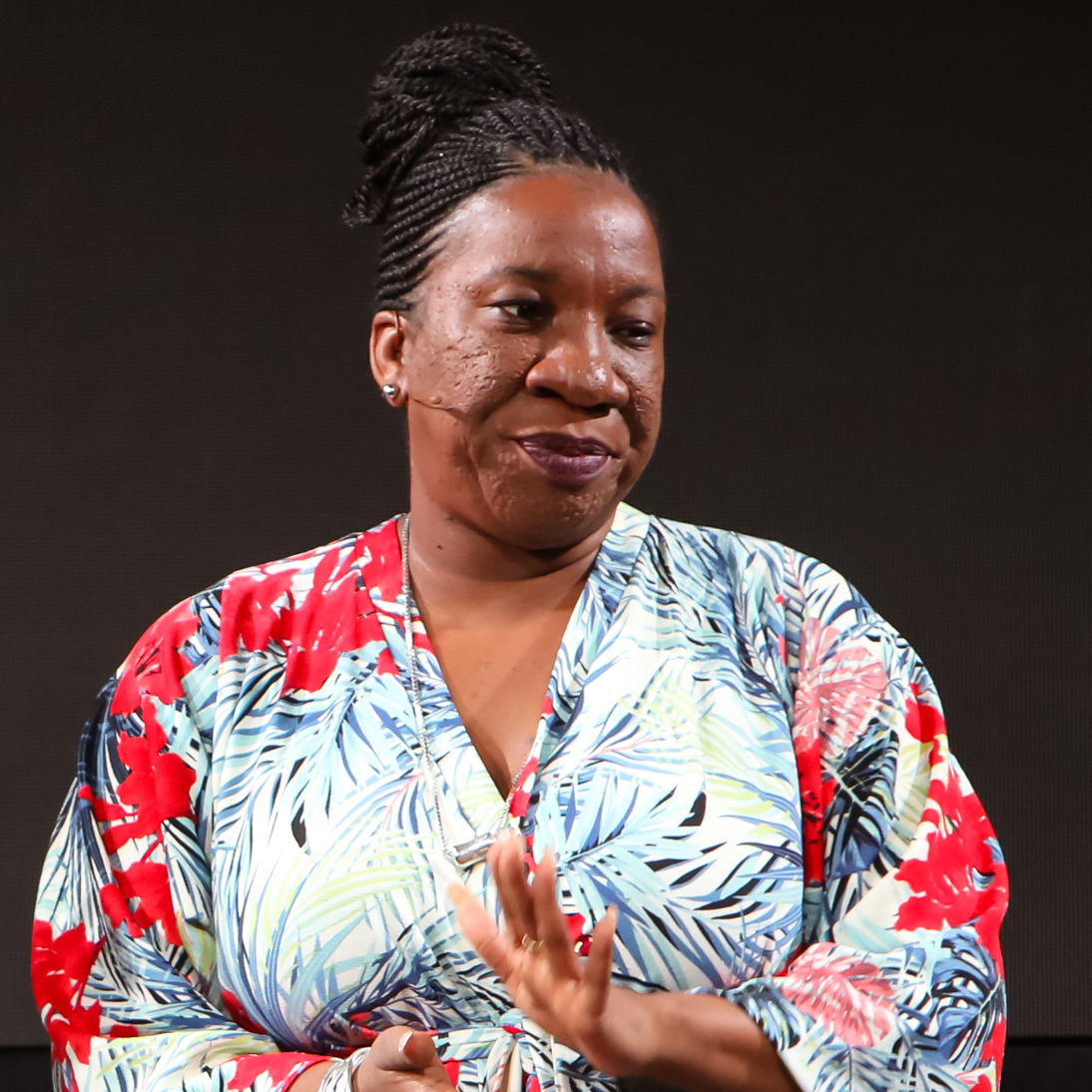
Pink references "Girls Just Want to Have Fun" by Cyndi Lauper (left) in the song's lyrics, while Tarana Burke (right) can be seen in the music video.

"Irrelevant" was written by Pink alongside the track's producer Ian Fitchuk, and it marks their first collaboration. It is a pop punk and pop rock song, described as a protest anthem by music critics. It is a "thumping, guitar-strumming" song, with lyrics encouraging to fight for one's rights. In the pre-chorus she sings "You can call me irrelevant, insignificant / You can try to make me small / I'll be your heretic, you fuckin' hypocrite / I won't think of you at all", after which she asks people who hide their actions behind Christianity: "Does Jesus love the ignorant?" According to her, "he'd gladly take us all". She nods to the Who's "The Kids Are Alright" (1965) chanting in the chorus: "The kids are not alright / None of us are right / I'm tired but I won't sleep tonight / 'Cause I still feel alive / The kids are not alright (not alright)." While in the bridge, she references Cyndi Lauper's 1983 hit "Girls Just Want to Have Fun", belting "Girls just wanna have rights / So why do we have to fight?" Additionally, the singer is claiming ownership of her voice, opinions and self-worth in the song's lyrics.

Good Housekeeping reported that fans were "stunned" by "Irrelevant" and that they "bombard[ed] Pink's Instagram with emotional comments". Alexa Camp of Slant Magazine was keen of the track, opining that it "channels the scrappy energy and brash outspokenness that helped make Pink a star" which was, according to her, lacking on her past few efforts. On a similar note, Julien Goncvales said that "Irrelevant" is a "ferocious anthem, with pop-rock sounds that will delight listeners—early fans". iHeartRadio's Sarah Tate commented that by the song Pink "transform[ed] hateful comments she has received into a powerful protest anthem". Writing for Entertainment Tonight, Sarah Schillaci described the track as "charged-up"; while Dan DeLuca from The Philadelphia Inquirer labeled it as an "emphatic protest song, a rallying cry of defiance in which the singer refuses to be defined by others and works herself up into a righteous rage".

== Music video ==
The music video for "Irrelevant" was directed by Pink and Brad Comfort premiered on the former's official YouTube channel on July 18, 2022. It mixes clips taken on various protests and footage that Pink recorded herself in the studio. Protests shown in the video were from civil rights movement, marches in support of MeToo movement, LGBT rights, Black Lives Matter, and calls for an end to gun violence. The video also shows activists like Tarana Burke and Muhammad Ali, as well as politicians like Donald Trump and Rudy Giuliani. Billboard's Kyle Denis called the visual "chilling" and tracing a "through-line between past and present struggles for justice", in addition commenting: "Although [Pink has] become known for her high-flying acrobatic performances, the star gives an equally arresting performance with her anguished delivery of the lyrics." According to Leach Asmelash of CNN, the singer is protesting against sexism and racism in the video.

== Credits and personnel ==
- Pink – vocals, songwriting
- Ian Fitchuk – songwriting, production, acoustic guitar, bass, keyboards
- Sarah Buxton – backing vocals
- Court Clement – acoustic guitar, electric guitar
- Aaron Sterling – drums
- Jeff Gunnel – editing, programming, engineering
- Konrad Snyder – engineering
- Spike Stent – mixing
- Matt Wollach – assistant mixing
- Dave Kutch – mastering

== Charts ==
=== Weekly charts ===
Weekly chart performance for "Irrelevant"
Chart (2022–2023)	Peak position
Australia (ARIA)	73
Belgium (Ultratop 50 Flanders)	37
Canada AC (Billboard)	11
Canadian Digital Song Sales (Billboard)	5
Canada Hot AC (Billboard)	37
ERROR in "CIS": Invalid position: 299. Expected number 1–200 or dash (–).
Croatia (HRT)	3
Czech Republic Airplay (ČNS IFPI)	1
France Airplay (SNEP)	23
Germany Download (Official German Charts)	27
Japan Hot Overseas (Billboard Japan)	17
Iceland (Tónlistinn)	35
Mexico (Billboard Mexico Airplay)	37
Mexico (Billboard Ingles Airplay)	5
Netherlands (Tipparade)	26
New Zealand Hot Singles (RMNZ)	7
Slovakia Airplay (ČNS IFPI)	16
Switzerland Airplay (Hitparade)	51
UK Singles Downloads (Official Charts)	16
US Adult Contemporary (Billboard)	23
US Adult Pop Airplay (Billboard)	34
US Digital Song Sales (Billboard)	6

=== Year-end charts ===
Year-end chart performance for "Irrelevant"
Chart (2022)	Position
Belgium (Ultratop 50 Flanders)	190
