= Trustfall (song) =

Single by Pink

from the album Trustfall
- Released: January 27, 2023
- Studio: Fieldwork Studios (London, England); Fieldwork Studios (Los Angeles, California)
- Genre: Synth-pop; EDM
- Length: 3:57
- Label: RCA
- Songwriters: Alecia Moore; Johnny McDaid; Fred Gibson
- Producers: Johnny McDaid; Fred Again

Pink singles chronology
"Never Gonna Not Dance Again" (2022)	"Trustfall" (2023)	"When I Get There" (2023)

Music video
- "Trustfall" on YouTube

"Trustfall" is a song by American singer Pink, released as the second single from her ninth studio album Trustfall on January 27, 2023. The EDM and synth-pop song was co-written by Pink with Johnny McDaid and Fred Again, who also both produced the song.

== Composition ==
"Trustfall" has been described as a "synthpop club banger" and an "emotional electro anthem", eschewing her "signature pop-rock sound". The song contains a "driving EDM beat" and "emotionally fraught lyrics" about confronting fear and trusting things will work out. According to the sheet music published at Musicnotes.com by EMI Blackwood and Sony/ATV Music Publishing, the song is written in the key of A♭ major with a tempo of 122 beats per minute.

== Critical reception ==
The song earned generally positive reviews from music critics. John Murphy from musicOMH declared "Trustfall" to be "up there with some of her best work" and described it as "a pulsating electro-anthem that's [...] reminiscent of Robyn." Similarly, Michael Cragg, writing for The Guardian, called the "pulsating, Robyn-like" song one the "few pleasing tangents" on its parent album, while PopMatters critic Jeffrey Davies noted that the "EDM production [..] begs to be put on repeat." Ed Power from The Irish Examiner found the song to be a "brooding bopper, with Pink pushing her husky vocals to breaking point as house honcho Fred Again layers in bright, bouncy grooves."

Lucy Case of Renowned for Sound called the song a "modern EDM anthem packed with P!nk’s soaring vocals." while Sam Damshenas noted that "Trustfall" "marks a huge departure from P!nk’s signature pop-rock sound with a pulsating EDM beat." Arwa Haider from Financial Times found that the "EDM-fuelled title track [...] could have connected emotionally. But the usually intrepid Fred Again sounds restrained here in a generic "epic groove," albeit one elevated by Pink's vocals." Less impressed, Kate French-Morris from The Telegraph called "Trustfall" a "robustly bland hit." In a negative review, Roisin O'Connor from The Independent wrote: "The title track borrows too heavily from Robyn's playbook and consequently only serves to remind you that the "Dancing On My Own" artist does it better."

== Accolades ==
Awards and nominations for "Trustfall"
Organization	Year	Category	Result	Ref.
MTV Video Music Awards	2023	Best Pop	Nominated	

== Music video ==
The track's music video was released the same day as the song, and directed by Georgia Hudson. It stars Pink and a young woman who is trying to find the confidence to talk to a man she is interested in at a house party. Pink also stands atop a hotel and dances on a dark street, which was choreographed by Ryan Heffington.

== Charts ==
=== Weekly charts ===
Weekly chart performance
Chart (2023–24)	Peak position
Australia (ARIA)	19
Austria (Ö3 Austria Top 40)	12
Belarus Airplay (TopHit)	72
Belgium (Ultratop 50 Flanders)	7
Belgium (Ultratop 50 Wallonia)	3
Canada Hot 100 (Billboard)	24
Canada AC (Billboard)	1
Canada CHR/Top 40 (Billboard)	36
Canada Hot AC (Billboard)	4
CIS Airplay (TopHit)	39
Croatia International Airplay (Top lista)	3
Czech Republic Airplay (ČNS IFPI)	2
Denmark Airplay (Tracklisten)	9
Estonia Airplay (TopHit)	4
France (SNEP)	43
France Airplay (SNEP)	2
Germany (GfK)	17
Global 200 (Billboard)	70
Hungary (Rádiós Top 40)	29
Hungary (Single Top 40)	7
Ireland (IRMA)	11
Japan Hot Overseas (Billboard Japan)	13
Latvia Airplay (LaIPA)	1
Lithuania (AGATA)	67
Lithuania Airplay (TopHit)	7
Netherlands (Dutch Top 40)	7
Netherlands (Single Top 100)	32
New Zealand (Recorded Music NZ)	36
Norway (VG-lista)	24
Poland (Polish Airplay Top 100)	1
Poland (Polish Streaming Top 100)	57
Romania Airplay (TopHit)	32
Slovakia Airplay (ČNS IFPI)	3
Sweden (Sverigetopplistan)	26
Switzerland (Schweizer Hitparade)	8
Turkey International Airplay (Radiomonitor Türkiye)	3
Ukraine Airplay (TopHit)	29
UK Singles (Official Charts)	14
US Billboard Hot 100	82
US Adult Contemporary (Billboard)	15
US Adult Pop Airplay (Billboard)	5
US Hot Dance/Electronic Songs (Billboard)	3
US Pop Airplay (Billboard)	20

=== Monthly charts ===
Monthly chart performance
Chart (2023)	Peak position
CIS Airplay (TopHit)	42
Czech Republic (Rádio Top 100)	2
Estonia Airplay (TopHit)	3
Latvia Airplay (TopHit)	40
Lithuania Airplay (TopHit)	18
Romania Airplay (TopHit)	36
Ukraine Airplay (TopHit)	43
Slovakia (Rádio Top 100)	6

=== Year-end charts ===
Year-end chart performance
Chart (2023)	Position
Austria (Ö3 Austria Top 40)	32
Belgium (Ultratop Flanders)	16
Belgium (Ultratop Wallonia)	13
Canada (Canadian Hot 100)	48
CIS Airplay (TopHit)	81
Estonia Airplay (TopHit)	10
France (SNEP)	179
Germany (Official German Charts)	38
Latvia Airplay (TopHit)	112
Lithuania Airplay (TopHit)	29
Netherlands (Dutch Top 40)	11
Netherlands (Single Top 100)	94
Poland (Polish Airplay Top 100)	16
Romania Airplay (TopHit)	130
Switzerland (Schweizer Hitparade)	58
Ukraine Airplay (TopHit)	195
US Adult Contemporary (Billboard)	36
US Adult Top 40 (Billboard)	19
US Digital Song Sales (Billboard)	45
US Hot Dance/Electronic Songs (Billboard)	6

Chart (2024)	Position
Estonia Airplay (TopHit)	181

== Certifications ==
Certifications for "Trustfall"
Region	Certification	Certified units/sales
Australia (ARIA)	Gold	35,000^{‡}
Belgium (BRMA)	Gold	20,000^{‡}
Canada (Music Canada)	Platinum	80,000^{‡}
Denmark (IFPI Danmark)	Gold	45,000^{‡}
France (SNEP)	Platinum	200,000^{‡}
Germany (BVMI)	Gold	300,000^{‡}
Hungary (MAHASZ)	Gold	2,000^{‡}
New Zealand (RMNZ)	Platinum	30,000^{‡}
Poland (ZPAV)	2× Platinum	100,000^{‡}
Switzerland (IFPI Switzerland)	Platinum	20,000^{‡}
United Kingdom (BPI)	Platinum	600,000^{‡}
^{‡} Sales+streaming figures based on certification alone.

== Release history ==
Release dates and formats for "Trustfall"
Region	Date	Format	Label	Ref.
Various	January 27, 2023	Digital download; streaming	RCA	
United States	February 20, 2023	Hot adult contemporary radio	RCA	
United States	April 3, 2023	Pop radio	RCA	
