= The Truth About Love Tour =

2013–14 concert tour by Pink

- Tour by Pink
- Associated album: The Truth About Love
- Start date: February 13, 2013
- End date: January 31, 2014
- Legs: 4
- No. of shows: 142
- Supporting acts: The Hives; City and Colour; Walk the Moon; Churchill; Redrama; Wafande; The Kin; Youngblood Hawke; The Preatures; Spiderbait; New Politics
- Box office: $184,061,847
- Website: Tour website

Pink concert chronology
- Funhouse Summer Carnival (2010); The Truth About Love Tour (2013–14); Beautiful Trauma World Tour (2018–19)

The Truth About Love Tour was the sixth concert tour by American singer-songwriterP!nk. Sponsored by CoverGirl, and showcasing music from her sixth studio album The Truth About Love, the tour played over 140 shows in Australia, Europe and North America. Shows in Melbourne, Victoria were recorded and released on a concert DVD, The Truth About Love Tour: Live from Melbourne.

== Critical response ==
Jason Bracelin from the Las Vegas Review-Journal called P!nk a: "party girl with a heart of gold", while Jim Harrington from Mercury News said Pink "is the new gold standard", adding that:

you definitely don't walk away from a Pink show shrugging your shoulders and muttering 'meh.' It's far more likely that fans practically skip out of the building, feeling extremely satisfied with the experience and determined to tell others to 'go see Pink next time she's in town' [...] Honesty is, as they say, the best policy. And, after watching the Truth About Love Tour, I can honestly say that few, if any, performers deliver better pop spectacles than Pink.

August Brown of the Los Angeles Times opined that P!nk is: "perhaps the most gifted and imaginative physical performer in pop right now." He believed P!nk's set served as a reminder that: "her best asset in performing – more than her aerialist talents or Joplin-esque power-rasp voice, is her self-awareness."

Steve Appleford from Rolling Stone, who was also at the L.A. show, described the vaudeville as a: "grown-up, sophisticated show, and Pink was relaxed and chatty between songs." He went on to praise the singer, adding that:

by the time Pink was soaring gracefully through the air on cables stretched across the arena to perform "So What", the singer had demonstrated an epic workout of vocals, stagecraft and stunt-work without missing a note. The night's best special effect was Pink herself.

Craig Rosen from The Hollywood Reporter summed up the show with: "P!nk launches back to the top of pop with acrobatic stunts and killer vocals." After the Houston show, Jane Howze from Culture Map Houston gave a positive review, believing that The Truth About Love show was poised to be 2013's concert of the year. She added:

I have always said that Chris Martin, frontman of Coldplay is the hardest working entertainer around, but I’m reconsidering, and now I’m giving Pink the nod. A Pink concert is a little like a Cirque du Soleil performance. There is so much happening on stage—the songs, the dancing and of course the acrobatics—it is a feast for the senses.

Giving a rave review, Sean Daly of Times Pop Music Critic judged P!nk has proven:

there are no longer any viable excuses for a performer to ever lip-synch again. If this 33-year-old mom could soulfully belt out opening hit "Raise Your Glass" while boing-boing-ing rafter-high via bungee ropes, the Britney's and Beyoncé's of the Top 40 realm can't claim dance moves or chilly climes as decent reasons to switch off the mike.

Of her Palace of Auburn Hills show, Adam Graham of The Detroit News stated: "Tuesday's concert was Pink's first area headlining show since 2002, and she's now entered a master class of pop spectacle providers. She displayed the physicality of Madonna in the way she led her troupe of dancers, and the production was on par with that of any big name pop act". Mario Tarradel of Dallas News, in his review of P!nk's Dallas show, felt that:

It's easy to like Pink. Her rock-charged brand of pop-dance is radio ready, but it's anchored in wit and grit. She's got a pliable voice with lung power and melodic grace. She's unbelievably taut with abs of steel and an adventurous streak. She's got attitude, and no qualms about tossing a few expletives. But mostly Pink is an awesome performer. Pink is a natural.,

The Toronto Sun complimented P!nk's performing abilities:

Pink was up for anything and everything as she bounced around on bungee cords, twirled around on hanging cloths, danced like a modern day Isadora Duncan and in the show's jaw-dropping pentultimate song, "So What", flew around the arena attached to four cables that turned her into a rock n’ roll Tinkerbell. She was equal parts gymnast, singer, dancer and even drummer.

The Star Tribune gave the show an overwhelming review, stating that P!nk:

put on arguably the most daring concert in the history of arena rock [...] It was incredibly entertaining — way superior to Madonna's and Lady Gaga's. It set a standard that Rihanna (coming Sunday) and Beyoncé (due in July) will have to live up to.

Jim Farber of NY Daily News gave a rave review of the show, saying that P!nk:

reaches new heights in performance that puts her talent, composure on display ... yet it's to Pink's considerable credit that no matter how many bright lights, fast-moving sets or fancy dancers surrounded her, she kept her talent and character front and center. In the end, that's what gave the audience its ultimate high.

Entertainment Weekly gave a glowing review of P!nk's vocals and performing skills:

"The "Truth About Love" tour is a lot of things (including game show and circus) but it is one thing above all: a showcase for the power-pop anthem, which Pink pulled and pushed on with a showboating snarl. Do you have to be a Pink fan to enjoy the tour? It's a ridiculous question: you’ll be blasted by almost two hours of music and end up a Pink fan, regardless. The wall-to-wall setlist had its interludes, in the form of spotlit one-offs (a guitar solo; an appearance by a man-in-the-moon straight out of a Méliès short; philosophy from our host of the game show-within-a-tour) and a late-in-the-night turn toward the acoustic. But the audience filled in around even the sound of a lone instrument. This was not the kind of crowd for stillness.

James Reed of The Boston Globe praised her vocals, stating that she is the: "rare performer who handles party anthems ("Raise Your Glass") and heartbreaking ballads ("Just Give Me a Reason") with equal élan."

The Irish Times gave the show an extremely positive review, stating that:

as ever with Pink, it is all about the movements, her athleticism, a wow factor that makes Madonna's taught and precise dance scenes on The MDNA Tour seem desperately flat. So here's the key: the reason Pink's live show is one of the best in the world is her live USP, which is aerial athleticism. You can have all the pyro you want at a Rihanna show, and all the ridonkulous costume changes at a Gaga gig, but Pink can FLY. The sense of danger as she descends silks, clambers around a spinning steel globe cage, the Broadway bonanza of her zip-lining into the gods, that's what makes Pink gigs next level. And man do the crowd appreciate it. Screaming women with identikit haircuts whoop her every flex and step. They know that nobody else can do a show like this. It's Pink's territory and hers alone. It's an aesthetic, however, that is also pretty over. While the topic of sex is occasionally apparent in Pink's writing (most awkwardly in ‘**** Like You’), she is a completely different beast to the plastic sex cartoons that Katy Perry, Britney, Christina, Rihanna, and basically every other poptart animate. Some people take all the glory for themselves, but Pink puts on a show, and then acknowledges the hard work from many that goes into it, even if as the remarkable centrepoint to it, she could probably claim all the kudos in the world.

Alice Vincent of The Daily Telegraph gave the show 4/5 stars, praising the show's set list:

Pink's set list was well curated from an extensive back catalogue, rewarding hardened fans with a short medley of the early R&B tracks which made her a star. That these were performed with the same genuine enthusiasm as the hits from her last album (her seventh but first to make number one in America), is a testament to Pink's talent, and explains why she continues to sell records. Ten-year-old songs don't sound dated because she has maintained the same energy and sass that she created them with.

Ian Gittins of The Guardian gave the show 4/5 stars, conceded that: "Pink may not be the most original singer-songwriter touring the world's enormodomes, nor the most gifted, but she makes up for these shortcomings with a live show akin to a pop-punk take on Cirque du Soleil." Polly Coufos of The Australian praised P!nk's cover of Cyndi Lauper's "Time After Time":

A little later this fearlessness was echoed with her first performance of Cyndi Lauper's Time After Time. She tackled the pop classic with the lyrics in her hand, the tentative reading providing great balance with the precision required for most of the numbers. That may be Pink's greatest asset, that she can create a spectacular show that more than matches her peers, but the glitz never hides the pure, unvarnished talent at her core.

The Herald Sun reviewed one of P!nk's 18 Melbourne shows:

P!nk's The Truth About Love tour takes concerts to the next level by aiming for the sky. The singing acrobat spends a good third of this new show in the air defying gravity because, unlike 99 per cent of her contemporaries, she can. And even when she's hanging upside down or spinning above your head she's singing completely live. Again, because she can.

== Commercial performance ==
Over 320,000 tickets for the Australian leg of the tour were sold within a few hours of release. The tour broke records for a solo artist tour in Australia with over 650,000 tickets sold. 200,000 tickets were sold for shows in Melbourne breaking a record P!nk had set herself with 2009's Funhouse Tour. At the 2013 Billboard Touring Awards, Pink won the award for "Top Boxscore".

The first North American leg of tour grossed $28.3 million from 26 shows, with an average gross per city of $1,134,385. The European leg grossed $30.7 million. The nine-week leg of Australia was expected to generate $100 million.

In Australia, initial grosses reported topped $31.6 million ($29.2 million) from two venues in Sydney and one in Brisbane, however that total did not include the four-night stint in the city of Adelaide, and a record-breaking eighteen shows in Melbourne.

The Truth About Love Tour was the third highest-grossing tour of 2013 behind Bon Jovi, and Cirque du Soleil's Michael Jackson The Immortal World Tour. P!nk was also the third highest grossing female touring artist of 2013, behind Beyoncé and Taylor Swift.

== Records ==
The Truth About Love Tour broke two records at the Rod Laver Arena, in Melbourne, Australia. P!nk is the artist who has performed the most shows at the venue, with a significant 18 sold-out shows on The Truth About Love Tour. This record surpassed her previous 17-show record at the venue during her 2009 Funhouse Tour. She was also the first artist to sell more than 250,000 tickets at the venue. On August 26, 2013, P!nk was rewarded a plaque backstage, a second pink pole, a star at the venue's entrance and Door 18 was painted pink.

P!nk broke Kylie Minogue's record of most concerts by a female performer at the Entertainment Centre having played twenty-six shows at the venue. Her four sold-out shows at the Allphones Arena in Sydney with more than 67,000 tickets sold, broke the record set by fellow popstar Britney Spears in 2009 with her The Circus Tour.

After playing to nearly 15,000 fans per night in Perth, P!nk now also holds the record for most performances by an artist at the RAC Arena, as well as the top four attended events at the venue.

Michael Coppel, President and CEO of Live Nation Australia, thanked P!nk for spending three months on tour in this country. "Everyone at LNA has been thrilled to be involved in Pink's record breaking tour, continuing a decade-long association with an artist who continues to set new standards and who has now sold in excess of 1.5 million tickets in Australia."

The pop star broke her own mark at Melbourne's Rod Laver Arena with the 18th sold-out performance, having set a house record in 2009 with seventeen shows on her Funhouse tour. The combined gross of $29.2 million (US$) in Melbourne was the largest gross for any headliner at a single venue in 2013.

P!nk also sold out the KFC Yum!, in the process becoming the highest-grossing female artist to play the arena to date.

== Development ==
To transport and set up the tour, there was a chartered 747 jumbo jet, nineteen semi-trailers, and eighty crew members to set up 400 tons of equipment. She also opened her first pop-up store which featured things that are not normally available at her concerts. Merchandise included autographed items, backstage passes, T-shirts, key rings, show tickets, etc.

== Recordings ==
Truth About Love Tour: Live From Melbourne was released in November 2013 on DVD.

== Set list ==
The following set list is representative of the show in Melbourne. It is not representative of all concerts for the duration of the tour.

1. "Raise Your Glass"
2. "Walk of Shame"
3. "Just Like a Pill"
4. "U + Ur Hand"
5. "Leave Me Alone (I'm Lonely)"
6. "Try"
7. "Wicked Game"
8. "Just Give Me a Reason"
9. "Trouble"
10. "Are We All We Are"
11. "How Come You're Not Here"
12. "Sober"
13. "The Great Escape"
14. "Who Knew"
15. ”Time After Time”
16. "Fuckin' Perfect"
17. "Most Girls" / "There You Go" / "You Make Me Sick"
18. "Slut Like You"
19. "Blow Me (One Last Kiss)"

Encore

20. "So What"

Notes

- During the first leg of the tour, "Glitter in the Air" was performed as the final song. Moreover, "Family Portrait" was performed at selected dates (like in Los Angeles on February 16, 2013).
- At selected dates in Australia, P!nk performed an acoustic version of Cyndi Lauper's "Time After Time".
- Nate Ruess joined Pink onstage during the performance of "Just Give Me a Reason" in Hamburg on May 1, 2013.

== Shows ==
List of concerts, showing date, city, country, venue, opening act, tickets sold, number of available tickets and amount of gross revenue
Date	City	Country	Venue	Opening act	Attendance	Revenue
North America
February 13, 2013	Phoenix	United States	US Airways Center	The Hives	14,267 / 14,267	$938,923
February 15, 2013	Paradise (Note: Promoted as Las Vegas.)	United States	Mandalay Bay Events Center	The Hives	9,511 / 9,511	$1,033,984
February 16, 2013	Los Angeles	United States	Staples Center	The Hives	15,562 / 15,562	$1,140,275
February 18, 2013	San Jose	United States	HP Pavillon	The Hives	14,187 / 14,187	$1,043,587
February 21, 2013	Houston	United States	Toyota Center	The Hives	13,247 / 13,646	$1,067,357
February 22, 2013	Dallas	United States	American Airlines Center	The Hives	15,567 / 15,567	$1,154,934
February 24, 2013	Orlando	United States	Amway Center	The Hives	13,414 / 13,414	$965,525
February 25, 2013	Sunrise	United States	BB&T Center	The Hives	13,732 / 13,732	$979,399
February 27, 2013	Tampa	United States	Tampa Bay Times Forum	The Hives	13,887 / 13,887	$1,004,292
March 1, 2013	Atlanta	United States	Philips Arena	The Hives	14,475 / 14,475	$990,929
March 2, 2013	Nashville	United States	Bridgestone Arena	The Hives	14,742 / 14,742	$1,014,329
March 5, 2013	Auburn Hills	United States	The Palace of Auburn Hills	The Hives	16,038 / 16,038	$1,132,177
March 6, 2013	Columbus	United States	Schottenstein Center	The Hives	14,841 / 14,841	$985,678
March 8, 2013	Louisville	United States	KFC Yum! Center	The Hives	17,686 / 17,686	$1,092,401
March 9, 2013	Chicago	United States	United Center	The Hives	16,609 / 16,609	$1,195,791
March 11, 2013	Toronto	Canada	Air Canada Centre	—N/a	16,188 / 16,188	$1,296,550
March 12, 2013	Montreal	Canada	Bell Centre	—N/a	16,873 / 16,873	$1,247,810
March 14, 2013	Washington, D.C.	United States	Verizon Center	The Hives	15,209 / 15,209	$1,196,486
March 16, 2013	Charlotte	United States	Time Warner Cable Arena	City and Colour	15,407 / 15,407	$1,011,592
March 17, 2013	Philadelphia	United States	Wells Fargo Center	City and Colour	16,611 / 16,611	$1,321,255
March 19, 2013	Saint Paul	United States	Xcel Energy Center	City and Colour	15,818 / 15,818	$1,146,010
March 22, 2013	New York City	United States	Madison Square Garden	The Hives	14,131 / 14,131	$1,347,083
March 23, 2013	East Rutherford	United States	Izod Center	The Hives	17,143 / 17,143	$1,285,608
March 25, 2013	Uniondale	United States	Nassau Coliseum	The Hives	13,740 / 13,740	$1,066,954
March 27, 2013	Uncasville	United States	Mohegan Sun Arena	The Hives	5,789 / 5,789	$604,851
March 28, 2013	Boston	United States	TD Garden	The Hives	14,766 / 14,766	$1,142,061
Europe
April 12, 2013	Dublin	Ireland	The O_{2}	Walk the Moon	12,889 / 12,889	$1,033,630
April 14, 2013	Manchester	England	Phones 4u Arena	Walk the Moon	35,610 / 35,610	$2,320,760
April 15, 2013	Manchester	England	Phones 4u Arena	Walk the Moon	35,610 / 35,610	$2,320,760
April 17, 2013	Paris	France	Palais Omnisports de Paris-Bercy	Walk the Moon	17,000 / 17,000	$1,203,450
April 19, 2013	Amsterdam	Netherlands	Ziggo Dome	Walk the Moon	16,771 / 16,771	$1,174,110
April 21, 2013	Birmingham	England	National Indoor Arena	Walk the Moon	14,947 / 14,947	$975,121
April 24, 2013	London	England	The O_{2} Arena	Walk the Moon; Churchill	69,162 / 69,162	$4,894,420
April 25, 2013	London	England	The O_{2} Arena	Walk the Moon; Churchill	69,162 / 69,162	$4,894,420
April 27, 2013	London	England	The O_{2} Arena	Walk the Moon; Churchill	69,162 / 69,162	$4,894,420
April 28, 2013	London	England	The O_{2} Arena	Walk the Moon; Churchill	69,162 / 69,162	$4,894,420
April 30, 2013	Antwerp	Belgium	Sportpaleis	Churchill	20,052 / 20,052	$1,240,880
May 1, 2013	Hamburg	Germany	O_{2} World Hamburg	Churchill	13,016 / 13,016	$909,572
May 3, 2013	Berlin	Germany	O_{2} World	Churchill	14,513 / 14,513	$940,673
May 4, 2013	Hanover	Germany	TUI Arena	Churchill	11,593 / 11,593	$871,651
May 6, 2013	Düsseldorf	Germany	ISS Dome	Churchill	10,848 / 10,848	$734,534
May 7, 2013	Frankfurt	Germany	Festhalle	Churchill	11,965 / 11,965	$808,467
May 9, 2013	Vienna	Austria	Wiener Stadthalle	Churchill	14,858 / 14,858	$1,146,330
May 10, 2013	Prague	Czech Republic	O_{2} Arena	Churchill	17,322 / 17,322	$969,882
May 12, 2013	Leipzig	Germany	Arena Leipzig	Churchill	12,342 / 12,342	$832,750
May 13, 2013	Dortmund	Germany	Westfalenhalle	Churchill	11,617 / 11,617	$797,815
May 15, 2013	Oberhausen	Germany	König-Pilsener-Arena	Churchill	11,768 / 11,768	$818,667
May 16, 2013	Mannheim	Germany	SAP Arena	Churchill	11,937 / 11,937	$809,357
May 18, 2013	Munich	Germany	Olympiahalle	Churchill	25,855 / 25,855	$1,759,650
May 19, 2013	Munich	Germany	Olympiahalle	Churchill	25,855 / 25,855	$1,759,650
May 21, 2013	Zürich	Switzerland	Hallenstadion	Churchill	13,000 / 13,000	$1,276,790
May 22, 2013	Stuttgart	Germany	Hanns-Martin-Schleyer-Halle	Churchill	13,196 / 13,196	$941,962
May 25, 2013	Fornebu (Note: Promoted as Oslo.)	Norway	Telenor Arena	Churchill	16,685 / 17,967	$1,659,300
May 26, 2013	Stockholm	Sweden	Ericsson Globe	Churchill	14,975 / 14,975	$1,134,870
May 28, 2013	Helsinki	Finland	Hartwall Arena	Redrama	11,464 / 11,464	$1,005,060
May 30, 2013	Herning	Denmark	Jyske Bank Boxen	Wafande	15,160 / 15,160	$1,396,530
Oceania
June 25, 2013	Perth	Australia	Perth Arena	The Kin	58,587 / 58,587	$7,287,630
June 26, 2013	Perth	Australia	Perth Arena	The Kin	58,587 / 58,587	$7,287,630
June 28, 2013	Perth	Australia	Perth Arena	The Kin	58,587 / 58,587	$7,287,630
June 29, 2013	Perth	Australia	Perth Arena	The Kin	58,587 / 58,587	$7,287,630
July 1, 2013	Adelaide	Australia	Entertainment Centre Arena	The Kin	38,807 / 38,807	$4,608,100
July 2, 2013	Adelaide	Australia	Entertainment Centre Arena	The Kin	38,807 / 38,807	$4,608,100
July 4, 2013	Adelaide	Australia	Entertainment Centre Arena	The Kin	38,807 / 38,807	$4,608,100
July 5, 2013	Adelaide	Australia	Entertainment Centre Arena	The Kin	38,807 / 38,807	$4,608,100
July 7, 2013	Melbourne	Australia	Rod Laver Arena	The Kin	235,187 / 235,187 (Note: The score data is combined from the shows held at the Rod Laver Arena from July 7–17 and August 13–26, 2013, respectively.)	$29,201,400
July 8, 2013	Melbourne	Australia	Rod Laver Arena	The Kin	235,187 / 235,187	$29,201,400
July 10, 2013	Melbourne	Australia	Rod Laver Arena	The Kin	235,187 / 235,187	$29,201,400
July 11, 2013	Melbourne	Australia	Rod Laver Arena	The Kin	235,187 / 235,187	$29,201,400
July 13, 2013	Melbourne	Australia	Rod Laver Arena	The Kin	235,187 / 235,187	$29,201,400
July 14, 2013	Melbourne	Australia	Rod Laver Arena	The Kin	235,187 / 235,187	$29,201,400
July 16, 2013	Melbourne	Australia	Rod Laver Arena	The Kin	235,187 / 235,187	$29,201,400
July 17, 2013	Melbourne	Australia	Rod Laver Arena	The Kin	235,187 / 235,187	$29,201,400
July 19, 2013	Brisbane	Australia	Brisbane Entertainment Centre	The Kin	98,264 / 98,264 (Note: The score data is combined from the shows held at the Brisbane Entertainment Centre from July 19–23, August 29–30 and September 7–8, 2013, respectively.)	$12,037,400
July 20, 2013	Brisbane	Australia	Brisbane Entertainment Centre	The Kin	98,264 / 98,264	$12,037,400
July 22, 2013	Brisbane	Australia	Brisbane Entertainment Centre	The Kin	98,264 / 98,264	$12,037,400
July 23, 2013	Brisbane	Australia	Brisbane Entertainment Centre	The Kin	98,264 / 98,264	$12,037,400
July 30, 2013	Sydney	Australia	Sydney Entertainment Centre	Youngblood Hawke	94,994 / 94,994	$11,597,300
July 31, 2013	Sydney	Australia	Sydney Entertainment Centre	Youngblood Hawke	94,994 / 94,994	$11,597,300
August 2, 2013	Sydney	Australia	Sydney Entertainment Centre	Youngblood Hawke	94,994 / 94,994	$11,597,300
August 3, 2013	Sydney	Australia	Sydney Entertainment Centre	Youngblood Hawke	94,994 / 94,994	$11,597,300
August 6, 2013	Sydney	Australia	Sydney Entertainment Centre	Youngblood Hawke	94,994 / 94,994	$11,597,300
August 7, 2013	Sydney	Australia	Sydney Entertainment Centre	Youngblood Hawke	94,994 / 94,994	$11,597,300
August 9, 2013	Sydney	Australia	Sydney Entertainment Centre	Youngblood Hawke	94,994 / 94,994	$11,597,300
August 10, 2013	Sydney	Australia	Sydney Entertainment Centre	Youngblood Hawke	94,994 / 94,994	$11,597,300
August 13, 2013	Melbourne	Australia	Rod Laver Arena	Youngblood Hawke		
August 14, 2013	Melbourne	Australia	Rod Laver Arena	Youngblood Hawke		
August 16, 2013	Melbourne	Australia	Rod Laver Arena	Youngblood Hawke		
August 17, 2013	Melbourne	Australia	Rod Laver Arena	Youngblood Hawke		
August 19, 2013	Melbourne	Australia	Rod Laver Arena	Youngblood Hawke		
August 20, 2013	Melbourne	Australia	Rod Laver Arena	Youngblood Hawke		
August 22, 2013	Melbourne	Australia	Rod Laver Arena	Youngblood Hawke		
August 23, 2013	Melbourne	Australia	Rod Laver Arena	Youngblood Hawke		
August 25, 2013	Melbourne	Australia	Rod Laver Arena	Youngblood Hawke		
August 26, 2013	Melbourne	Australia	Rod Laver Arena	Youngblood Hawke		
August 29, 2013	Brisbane	Australia	Brisbane Entertainment Centre	The Preatures		
August 30, 2013	Brisbane	Australia	Brisbane Entertainment Centre	The Preatures		
September 1, 2013	Sydney	Australia	Allphones Arena	The Preatures	67,978 / 67,978	$7,986,170
September 2, 2013	Sydney	Australia	Allphones Arena	The Preatures	67,978 / 67,978	$7,986,170
September 4, 2013	Sydney	Australia	Allphones Arena	The Preatures	67,978 / 67,978	$7,986,170
September 5, 2013	Sydney	Australia	Allphones Arena	The Preatures	67,978 / 67,978	$7,986,170
September 7, 2013 (Note: The September 7, 2013 show at the Brisbane Entertainment Centre in Brisbane was originally scheduled to take place on August 27, 2013.)	Brisbane	Australia	Brisbane Entertainment Centre	Spiderbait		
September 8, 2013	Brisbane	Australia	Brisbane Entertainment Centre	Spiderbait		
North America
October 10, 2013	Oakland	United States	Oracle Arena	New Politics	14,048 / 14,048	$1,267,176
October 12, 2013	Los Angeles	United States	Staples Center	New Politics	28,124 / 28,124	$2,887,773
October 13, 2013	Los Angeles	United States	Staples Center	New Politics	28,124 / 28,124	$2,887,773
October 15, 2013	San Jose	United States	SAP Center	New Politics	13,834 / 13,834	$1,220,902
October 20, 2013	Seattle	United States	KeyArena	New Politics	12,740 / 12,740	$1,135,382
October 21, 2013	Vancouver	Canada	Rogers Arena	New Politics	15,117 / 15,117	$1,394,480
November 5, 2013	Chicago	United States	United Center	New Politics	15,583 / 15,583	$1,424,149
November 6, 2013	Auburn Hills	United States	The Palace of Auburn Hills	The Kin	13,867 / 13,867	$1,262,846
November 8, 2013	Des Moines	United States	Wells Fargo Arena	The Kin	13,894 / 13,894	$1,103,865
November 9, 2013	Lincoln	United States	Pinnacle Bank Arena	The Kin	13,883 / 13,883	$1,123,050
November 11, 2013	St. Louis	United States	Scottrade Center	The Kin	15,422 / 15,422	$1,220,713
November 12, 2013	Kansas City	United States	Sprint Center	The Kin	13,263 / 13,263	$1,122,833
November 14, 2013	San Antonio	United States	AT&T Center	The Kin	13,423 / 13,423	$1,122,919
November 16, 2013	Dallas	United States	American Airlines Center	The Kin	14,060 / 14,060	$1,387,539
November 17, 2013	North Little Rock	United States	Verizon Arena	The Kin	11,852 / 13,668	$942,167
November 20, 2013	Rosemont	United States	Allstate Arena	The Kin	13,786 / 13,786	$1,293,348
November 21, 2013	Indianapolis	United States	Bankers Life Fieldhouse	The Kin	13,647 / 13,647	$1,253,393
November 23, 2013	Cleveland	United States	Quicken Loans Arena	The Kin	15,957 / 15,957	$1,375,003
November 24, 2013	Washington, D.C.	United States	Verizon Center	The Kin	15,010 / 15,010	$1,473,553
November 30, 2013	Toronto	Canada	Air Canada Centre	The Hives	32,965 / 32,965	$2,716,310
December 2, 2013	Toronto	Canada	Air Canada Centre	The Hives	32,965 / 32,965	$2,716,310
December 3, 2013	Montreal	Canada	Bell Centre	The Hives	13,397 / 13,397	$1,214,170
December 5, 2013	Boston	United States	TD Garden	The Hives	14,306 / 14,306	$1,418,435
December 6, 2013	Philadelphia	United States	Wells Fargo Center	The Hives	15,822 / 15,822	$1,595,912
December 8, 2013	Brooklyn	United States	Barclays Center	The Hives	28,916 / 28,916	$2,592,472
December 9, 2013	Brooklyn	United States	Barclays Center	The Hives	28,916 / 28,916	$2,592,472
December 11, 2013	Newark	United States	Prudential Center	The Hives	14,031 / 14,031	$1,270,066
December 13, 2013	Birmingham	United States	BJCC Arena	The Hives	10,096 / 11,241	$808,287
December 14, 2013	Atlanta	United States	Philips Arena	The Hives	14,683 / 14,683	$1,316,729
January 7, 2014 (Note: The January 7, 2014 show at Target Center in Minneapolis was originally scheduled to take place on November 2, 2013.)	Minneapolis	United States	Target Center	New Politics	14,733 / 14,733	$1,361,547
January 9, 2014 (Note: The January 9, 2014 show at BMO Harris Bradley Center in Milwaukee was originally scheduled to take place on November 3, 2013.)	Milwaukee	United States	BMO Harris Bradley Center	New Politics	14,663 / 14,663	$1,168,427
January 11, 2014 (Note: The January 11, 2014 show at the Fargodome was originally scheduled to take place on October 27, 2013.)	Fargo	United States	Fargodome	The Kin	21,879 / 21,879	$1,613,670
January 14, 2014 (Note: The January 14, 2014 show at MTS Centre in Winnipeg was originally scheduled to take place on October 26, 2013.)	Winnipeg	Canada	MTS Centre	The Kin	13,034 / 13,034	$966,983
January 15, 2014 (Note: The January 15, 2014 show at Credit Union Centre in Saskatoon was originally scheduled to take place on October 24, 2013.)	Saskatoon	Canada	Credit Union Centre	The Kin	13,878 / 13,878	$904,023
January 16, 2014 (Note: The January 16, 2014 show at Rexall Place in Edmonton was originally scheduled to take place on October 23, 2013.)	Edmonton	Canada	Rexall Place	The Kin	14,632 / 14,632	$953,347
January 19, 2014 (Note: The January 19, 2014 show at Pepsi Center in Denver was originally scheduled to take place on October 18, 2013.)	Denver	United States	Pepsi Center	The Kin	13,518 / 13,518	$1,324,394
January 20, 2014 (Note: The January 20, 2014 show at Vivint Smart Home Arena in Salt Lake City was originally scheduled to take place on October 17, 2013.)	Salt Lake City	United States	EnergySolutions Arena	The Kin	15,738 / 15,738	$1,182,944
January 29, 2014	Anaheim	United States	Honda Center	The Kin	13,741 / 13,741	$1,260,064
January 30, 2014	Fresno	United States	Save Mart Center	The Kin	12,443 / 12,443	$975,412
January 31, 2014	Paradise	United States	MGM Grand Garden Arena	The Kin	13,064 / 13,064	$1,502,659
TOTAL					1,997,614 / 2,002,256 (99.8%)	$184,061,847

== Cancelled shows ==
Date	City	Country	Venue	Reason for cancellation
April 22, 2013	Birmingham	England	Arena Birmingham	Sickness

== Personnel ==
- Lead vocals, aerobatics, dancing, piano, executive producer, creator – P!nk
- Musical director, keyboards – Jason Chapman
- Drums – Mark Schulman
- Lead guitar – Justin Derrico
- Bass guitar – Eva Gardner
- Keyboards, rhythm guitar, vocals – Kat Lucas
- Vocals – Stacy Campbell
- Vocals – Jenny Douglas-Foote
- Dancing, dance captain – Tracy Shibata
- Dancing – Colt Prattes
- Dancing – Reina Hidalgo
- Dancing – Khasan Brailsford
- Dancing – Janelle Ginestra
- Dancing – Loriel Hennington
- Dancing – Remi Bakkar
- Host, dancing – Jimmy Slonina
- Choreography, aerial choreography - Nick Florez
- Choreography, aerial choreography - Rj Durell
- Aerial choreography – Dreya Weber
- Stage director, executive producer – Baz Halpin
- Musical Director, arrangements - Paul Mirkovich

== See also ==
- List of highest-grossing concert tours by women
