= The Truth About Love Tour: Live from Melbourne =

Video by Pink
- Released: November 15, 2013
- Venues: Rod Laver Arena (Melbourne, Australia)
- Genres: Pop; pop rock; R&B
- Length: 110:30
- Label: RCA
- Director: Larn Poland
- Producer: Roger Davies

Pink chronology
Funhouse Tour: Live in Australia (2009)	The Truth About Love Tour: Live from Melbourne (2013)

The Truth About Love Tour: Live from Melbourne is the fourth video album by American singer Pink. It was released on November 15, 2013, as a DVD and Blu-ray video release. The release features performances filmed during the Australian leg of Pink's sixth concert tour, The Truth About Love Tour.

== Background ==
A trailer for the album was released on Pink's official Vevo page on October 10, 2013.

== Commercial performance ==
The video was the best-selling music DVD of 2013 in Australia. It has been certified 16× Platinum by the Australian Recording Industry Association for selling more than 240,000 copies in Australia.

== Track listing ==
No.	Title	Length
1.	"The Truth About Love Intro"	2:29
2.	"Raise Your Glass"	4:13
3.	"Walk of Shame"	3:39
4.	"Just Like a Pill"	3:45
5.	"U + Ur Hand"	3:58
6.	"Leave Me Alone (I'm Lonely)"	6:38
7.	"Try"	4:05
8.	"Wicked Game"	4:57
9.	"Just Give Me a Reason" (featuring Nate Ruess)	5:52
10.	"Trouble"	5:17
11.	"Are We All We Are"	4:21
12.	"How Come You're Not Here"	4:08
13.	"Sober"	4:18
14.	"Chaos & Piss" (interlude)	4:50
15.	"The Great Escape"	5:13
16.	"Who Knew"	4:46
17.	"Time After Time"	4:38
18.	"Fuckin' Perfect"	5:31
19.	"Can't Take Me Home Medley"	6:07
20.	"Slut Like You"	3:40
21.	"Blow Me (One Last Kiss)"	8:39
22.	"So What"	3:57
23.	"Outro"	5:17

Bonus features
No.	Title	Length
1.	"The Truth About Tour"	31:50
2.	"A Day in the Life of Rubix"	1:50
3.	"Slut Like You" (bluegrass version)	3:25

== Musicians ==
- Jason Chapman – keyboards, backing vocals, musical director
- Justin Derrico – lead guitar
- Eva Gardner – bass guitar
- Kat Lucas – guitar, keyboards, backing vocals
- Stacy Campbell – backing vocals
- Jenny Douglas – backing vocals
- Mark Schulman – drums

== Release history ==
Region	Date	Format	Ref
Australia	November 15, 2013	Blu-ray; DVD	
Germany	November 22, 2013	Blu-ray; DVD	
France	November 25, 2013	Blu-ray; DVD	
Italy	November 25, 2013	Blu-ray; DVD	
United Kingdom	November 25, 2013	Blu-ray; DVD	
United States	January 21, 2014	Blu-ray; DVD	
