= The Truth About Love =

Studio album by Pink
- Released: September 14, 2012
- Recorded: January–May 2012
- Studios: Earthstar Creation Center (Venice, California); Conway (Los Angeles); Suite 203; The Modern Dirt Laboratories (London); Effigy Studios (Ferndale, Michigan); Fishhead Music (Sweden); Ruby Red Studios (Santa Monica, California); West Triad Studios (Venice, California); Echo Studios (Los Angeles)
- Genres: Pop; pop rock
- Length: 50:49
- Label: RCA
- Producers: Greg Kurstin; Pink; Butch Walker; Billy Mann; Jeff Bhasker; Eg White; John Hill; Emile Haynie; Max Martin; Shellback; DJ Khalil; Chin Injeti

Pink chronology
Greatest Hits... So Far!!! (2010)	The Truth About Love (2012)	Beautiful Trauma (2017)

Singles from The Truth About Love
- 1. "Blow Me (One Last Kiss)" Released: July 2, 2012; 2. "Try" Released: September 6, 2012; 3. "Just Give Me a Reason" Released: February 26, 2013; 4. "True Love" Released: June 28, 2013; 5. "Walk of Shame" Released: September 25, 2013; 6. "Are We All We Are" Released: October 31, 2013

The Truth About Love is the sixth studio album by American singer-songwriter Pink. It was released on September 14, 2012, through RCA Records. After giving birth to her first child in 2011, Pink started working on the album with longtime collaborator Billy Mann. With hopes of becoming more involved in the production of the album, she also reunited with Greg Kurstin and Butch Walker. Recording sessions took place between January and May 2012. The Truth About Love is primarily a pop and pop rock record and includes elements of electropop, dance-pop, and rock music. Its lyrics explore themes of love, monogamy, and sexuality, as evidenced by the album title. The songs on the album express various perspectives towards romance and delve into the realities of long-term relationships. It features guest appearances by Eminem, Lily Allen, and Nate Ruess.

The album received generally positive reviews from music critics, who commended Pink's thematic and musical direction. Buoyed by extensive marketing, The Truth About Love was a commercial success, topping the charts in eight countries, including Australia, Canada, Germany, and Sweden. In the United States, it became Pink's first number-one album on the Billboard 200 chart and was later certified triple platinum by the Recording Industry Association of America (RIAA) for sales of three million album-equivalent units. In Australia, The Truth About Love became the first album to top the year-end chart for two consecutive years and was certified nine times platinum by the Australian Recording Industry Association (ARIA). It was ranked as the seventh best-selling album of 2012, with sales of 2.6 million copies sold worldwide. By 2016, the album had sold over seven million copies globally.

Six tracks from the album were released as singles. "Blow Me (One Last Kiss)", the album's lead single, was released on July 2, 2012, and peaked at number five on the US Billboard Hot 100. The second single, "Try", attained the top-ten position in several countries worldwide, including Australia, Canada, Germany, the UK, and the US. It was followed by "Just Give Me a Reason", which topped the record charts in over ten countries worldwide and became Pink's fourth number-one single on the Billboard Hot 100. "True Love" charted moderately in various countries, while the album's other singles, "Walk of Shame" and "Are We All We Are", had a limited release. The album was further promoted through The Truth About Love Tour (2013–2014), which grossed $183 million upon completion. The Truth About Love was nominated for Best Pop Vocal Album at the 55th Annual Grammy Awards.

== Background and development ==
In November 2010, Pink released her first greatest hits album, titled Greatest Hits... So Far!!!. The album spawned two singles, "Raise Your Glass" and "Fuckin' Perfect", which achieved commercial success, peaking at number one and number two, respectively, on the US Billboard Hot 100. On June 2, 2011, Pink gave birth to her first child, a daughter named Willow Sage Hart. Despite media speculation that Pink would take an extended break from music to focus on motherhood, her management team suggested in an interview with American Top 40 that the singer could release a new album next year.

In March 2012, Pink confirmed via Twitter that she had begun working on her sixth studio album. In an open letter to her fans posted on her official website, she detailed the process of crafting the record, saying, "I'm putting my heart and soul into every song and there's a lot of that these days. This little girl has expanded me and what I am capable of feeling as a human". Pink later appeared on the cover of Cosmopolitan in June 2012. While discussing her return to the music scene, Pink revealed that the album was set to be released during the fall of the same year, and that she worked on new music with Billy Mann, among others. She added, "I've been in mommy mode, and I'm just starting to get back out there into the real world. I've been in the studio recording my new album, so now it feels like everything is falling back into place."

== Writing and recording ==
The development process of The Truth About Love took place between January and May 2012. Pink recorded the album in sessions at Earthstar Creation Center in Venice, Conway Recording Studios in Los Angeles, Suite 203, and The Modern Dirt Laboratories in London, UK. Before starting to work on the album, Pink contemplated how to successfully balance her music career and being a mother. In an interview for Rolling Stone, she explained, "Every album, I'm worried that I'm a dork and a fraud – what if I can't sing anymore? Then I stop thinking and start playing guitar, and I realize that it's ok to suck, and move forward". While her previous albums were created by working every day until the early morning, Pink said becoming a mother has changed the process of making music, essentially complying with a strict routine. Recording sessions were therefore held only from Monday to Friday between 1 p.m. and 10 pm, with breaks for nursing her daughter and having dinner. Weekends were off and dedicated to family time.

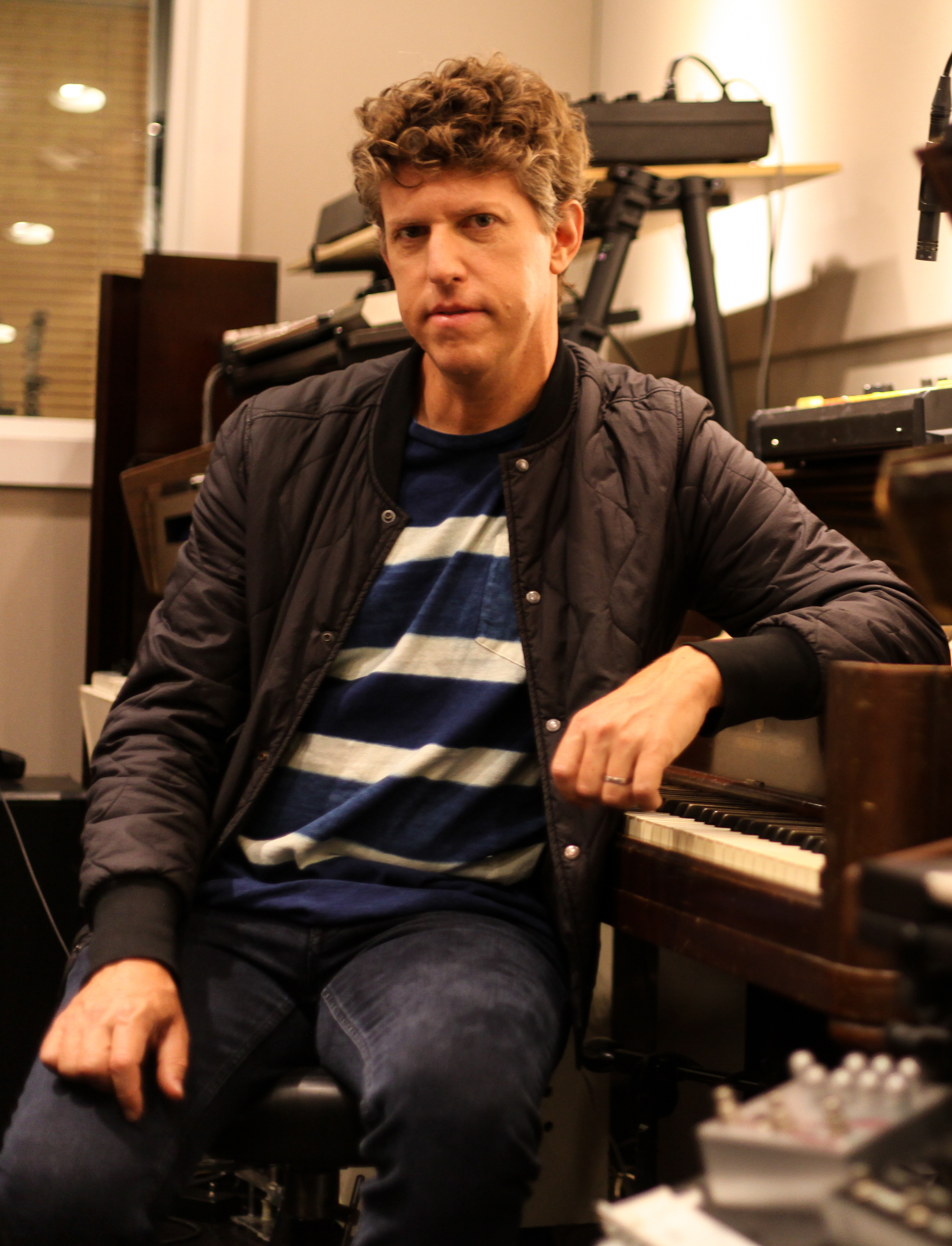
Greg Kurstin wrote and produced several tracks on The Truth About Love.

For The Truth About Love, Pink enlisted the help of her longtime collaborators, Billy Mann, Butch Walker, and Max Martin, as well as first-time collaborators Jeff Bhasker and Dan Wilson. Pink recalled that she started working on the album as "an experiment", and first met with Mann because she felt safe in a "no-shame zone" with him. She also reunited with record producer Greg Kurstin, with whom the singer had not collaborated since her fourth studio album, I'm Not Dead (2006). Noting that they shared great camaraderie, Pink felt that Kurstin would align with her musical ideas and elevate her production and musicality. Approximately 40 songs were written during the album's development process; Pink said she would write ideas for songs in her journal. The title track was the song that made her realize the project was taking a definite form and had a cohesive theme of love.

Pink drew inspiration for her songwriting from the various emotions she had experienced in her "exhausting search" for love, as well as the year she and husband Carey Hart were separated, admitting she was "still exorcising some demons". Explaining her writing process, Pink told Daily News that the record reflects her life at the time and her newfound happiness, inspired by motherhood. She continued, "Everything's a song. It's just a lot more fun. [...] I think that's a new thing for me. I was having a lot more fun than I was having before". She also sought to incorporate more musicality and raise the bar for herself, being more interested in the production aspects. Kurstin considered that the creative process was not difficult because Pink would compose lyrics fast once she felt inspired, comparing her work ethic with a stream of consciousness. Every day spent in the studio resulted in the completion of a new song, and Pink would record just "one or two takes", which, according to Kurstin, were "usually amazing".

Every song on the album was co-written by Pink, with the exception of "Try", which was written by Michael Busbee and Ben West, and was originally recorded in 2010 by their former band GoNorthToGoSouth. They later pitched "Try" to Rani Hancock, an A&R executive of RCA Records, hoping to give the song to Kelly Clarkson or Daughtry. A demo version was also recorded by Adam Lambert, but according to Busbee, he "just wasn't the right fit". After the song was played at a label meeting, the song was pitched to Pink. Pink agreed to record "Try", which Busbee said "was one of the first outside songs she had recorded in a long time". The concept of "Just Give Me a Reason" was developed during a songwriting session with Bhasker and Nate Ruess. Bhasker was introduced to Pink by Peter Edge, an executive of RCA Records. Pink approached Ruess because she was captivated by his "intense incredible" voice. After the first verse was written, Pink later worked on the lyrics at home. She envisioned that the song's conversational nature demanded another collaborator, and selected Ruess to be a guest vocalist. However, he was ambivalent about singing a duet with Pink because he only recorded a demo for the track. Nonetheless, Pink persuaded Ruess to record "Just Give Me a Reason" in a duet after "many, many months of convincing". She concluded; "I totally tricked him into doing it and I'm so glad that I was able to because no one could have done it better, and I think now he's very happy that he did it".

== Music and lyrical interpretation ==
=== Overview ===
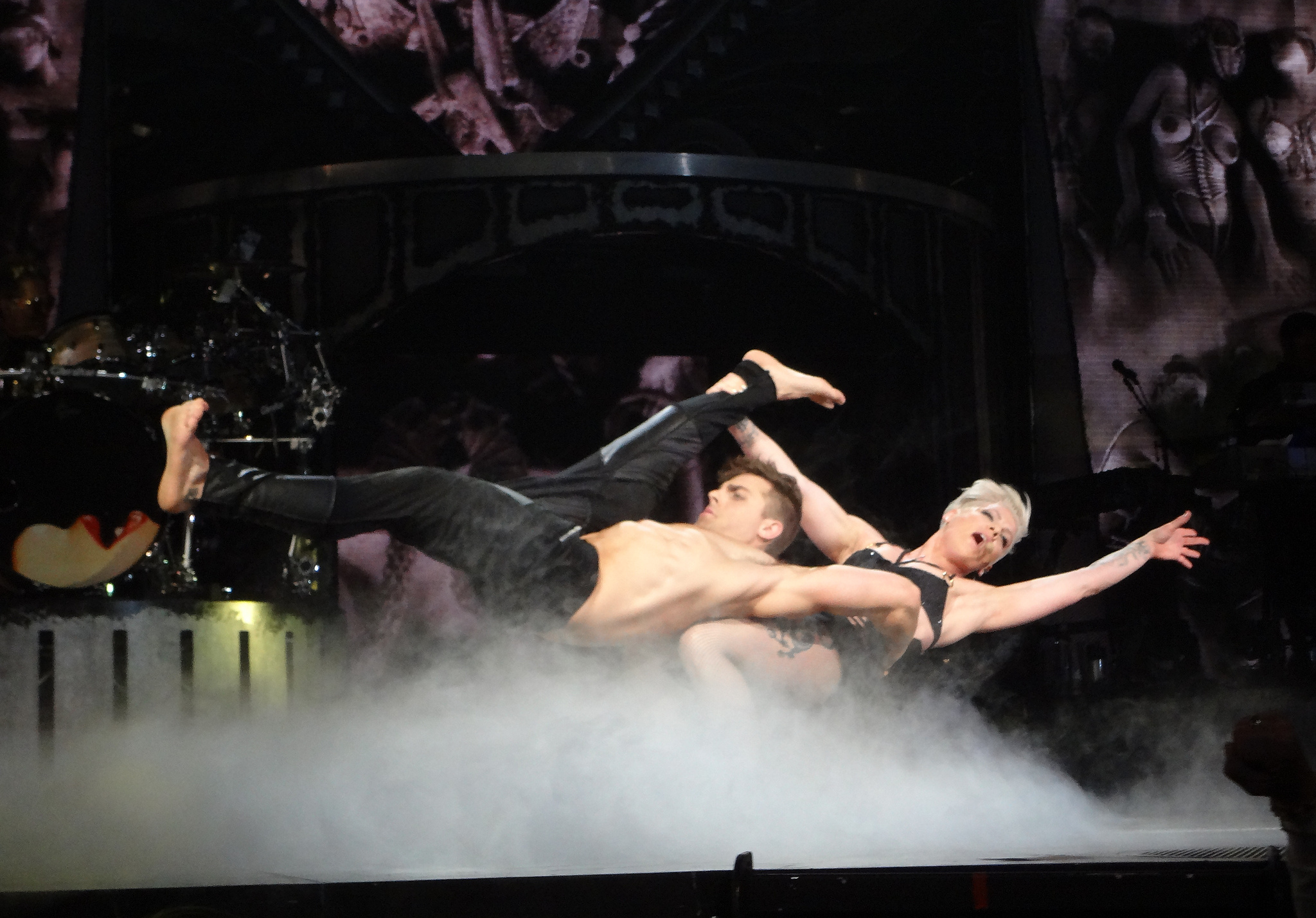
Pink performing the album's second single, "Try", during The Truth About Love Tour

The Truth About Love has been characterized as a pop and pop rock album that incorporates elements of electropop, dance-pop, and rock music. The album consists mostly of "shouty" pop songs with "radio-gripping hooks" and confessional power ballads. According to Jon Pareles of The New York Times, the album's instrumentation makes use of "dance beats, rock guitars, piano hymns, string orchestras, and hip-hop loops". Pink described The Truth About Love as a personal rock and roll record about monogamous relationships and different perspectives towards love, including "dark, light, happy, [and] sad", as well as "exploring how much it can hurt and how much it can feel good". Lyrical contents on the album are centered around Pink's recurring themes of love, sex, self-reliance, long-term relationships, and rebellion. The Truth About Love is a marked change in Pink's vocal style; she had quit smoking and expanded her upper vocal range by an octave.

Stephen Thomas Erlewine from AllMusic noted that the album explored more "grown-up emotions" and Pink "embracing every one of her contradictions". Kyle Anderson of Entertainment Weekly remarked the album's concept of expressing the darker side of love with "righteous anger [and] irreverence", while Sarah Godfrey of The Washington Post identified its tracks as "aggressive, attitudinal love songs". Mesfin Fekadu from the Associated Press summarized The Truth About Love as a "rollercoaster of emotions", comparing the album with "watching a reality show about the ups and downs of her relationship with her husband". Similarly, Christina Lee of Idolator suggested that the album documented Pink's year-long separation from her husband and her overall tumultuous relationship, pointing out the singer's realization that "the love of your life can also cause the heartbreak of your life".

=== Songs analysis ===
"Blow Me (One Last Kiss)"
Described as an "anti-love song", "Blow Me (One Last Kiss)" is an electropop song about the end of a relationship and Pink's desire to move on

The album opens with "Are We All We Are", a self-empowering protest song featuring instrumentation of "crashing drums", keyboards, and disorientated synthesizers. According to Diane Anderson-Minshall of The Advocate, lyrics such as "We are the people that you'll never get the best of" are inspired by economic inequality and the Occupy Wall Street movement. Described as a breakup anthem, the next track, "Blow Me (One Last Kiss)", is an upbeat electropop song with "Modest Mouse-style rock riffs" and "snappy guitars". The song drew comparisons to Kelly Clarkson's "Stronger (What Doesn't Kill You)" for having a similar sound; both songs were produced by Kurstin. The third track, "Try", is a 1980s-influenced power ballad about a damaged relationship and taking risks with love. It is followed by "Just Give Me a Reason", a duet with Nate Ruess. The lyrics find Pink pleading with a partner as they strive to stay together.

The album's fifth track, "True Love", is a humorous ska-pop and pop-rock song, with guest vocals from Lily Allen. Lyrically, it has been described as "a celebration of dysfunctional love" and retells aspects of Pink's riotous relationship. A 1970s inspired glam rock and blues number, "How Come You're Not Here?" shows Pink's furious side at a partner who may be in love with someone else. It contains distorted vocals, layered guitars, and bells played by Pink's daughter, Willow. "Slut Like You" is an electroclash song whose tongue-in-cheek lyrics talk about female empowerment and owning one's sexuality. Critics found similarities between the track and Blur's 1997 single, "Song 2", as well as references to the 1983 American crime drama film, Scarface. The next track on The Truth About Love is the title track, a retro 1960s influenced song. Its subject matter centers around the realities of a long-term relationship.

"Beam Me Up" is an acoustic ballad about taking a break from reality and longing to be with someone who has died. Pink revealed that the song was written "through a lot of tears" and was inspired by a close friend whose child had died. The tenth track, "Walk of Shame", is an anthemic new wave song about the embarrassment and regret on the morning after a one-night stand. Described as an "alternative club banger", the dance-inflected "Here Comes the Weekend" features guest vocals by Eminem. The song revolves around letting loose at a party, as she sings on the chorus, "Here comes/ Comes the weekend hear it calling like a siren/ We don't look for trouble/ Just enough to seeing double". It is followed by "Where Did the Beat Go?", a midtempo R&B song with military drums and multi-layered vocals. Its lyrics display a vulnerable Pink questioning a relationship falling apart and no longer feeling desired. The album's final song of the standard edition, "The Great Escape", is a piano ballad. Its somber lyrics explore themes of medication, going through difficult times, and contemplating suicide.

The deluxe version of The Truth About Love continues with the track "My Signature Move", an anthemic pop-rock song produced by Walker, while "Is This Thing On?" contains influences of four-on-the-floor. The next song is "Run", an emotional power ballad dedicated to Pink's daughter, with lyrics such as the opening lines, "Remember make believe in you/ All the things I said I'd do/ I wouldn't hurt you, like the world did me/ Keep you safe, I'd keep you sweet". The final track of the deluxe edition, "Good Old Days", is characterized by "a refreshing, live-in-the-moment" message and melancholic lyrics.

== Release and artwork ==
In 2011, RCA Music Group announced that it would be disbanding Jive Records, Arista, and J Records. With the shutdown, all artists previously signed to those labels, including Pink, would release their future material through RCA Records. Pink announced the album title during an interview on Australia's Today on July 4, 2012. The following day, she confirmed the album's release date as September 17, 2012, in the United Kingdom, and a day later in the United States. The album's artwork was unveiled through Pink's official website on July 16, 2012. Photographed by Andrew Macpherson, it depicts the singer with her "signature" pink hair crouching down and donning a short black top, short black shorts, garters, and red heels.

On September 4, 2012, Pink announced that she partnered with the American retail company Target for a promotional campaign. The partnership included the release of an exclusive, deluxe edition of The Truth About Love album, featuring four extra tracks, and Pink appearing in television commercials for Target to promote the album. A special Fan Edition of the album was released in November 2012. In addition to the standard version of the album, the Fan Edition contains six additional songs, as well as a DVD containing the music videos of "Blow Me (One Last Kiss)" and "Try", four live performances from a special The Truth About Love concert held in Los Angeles, and exclusive scenes from the album photoshoot.

== Promotion ==
=== Live performances ===
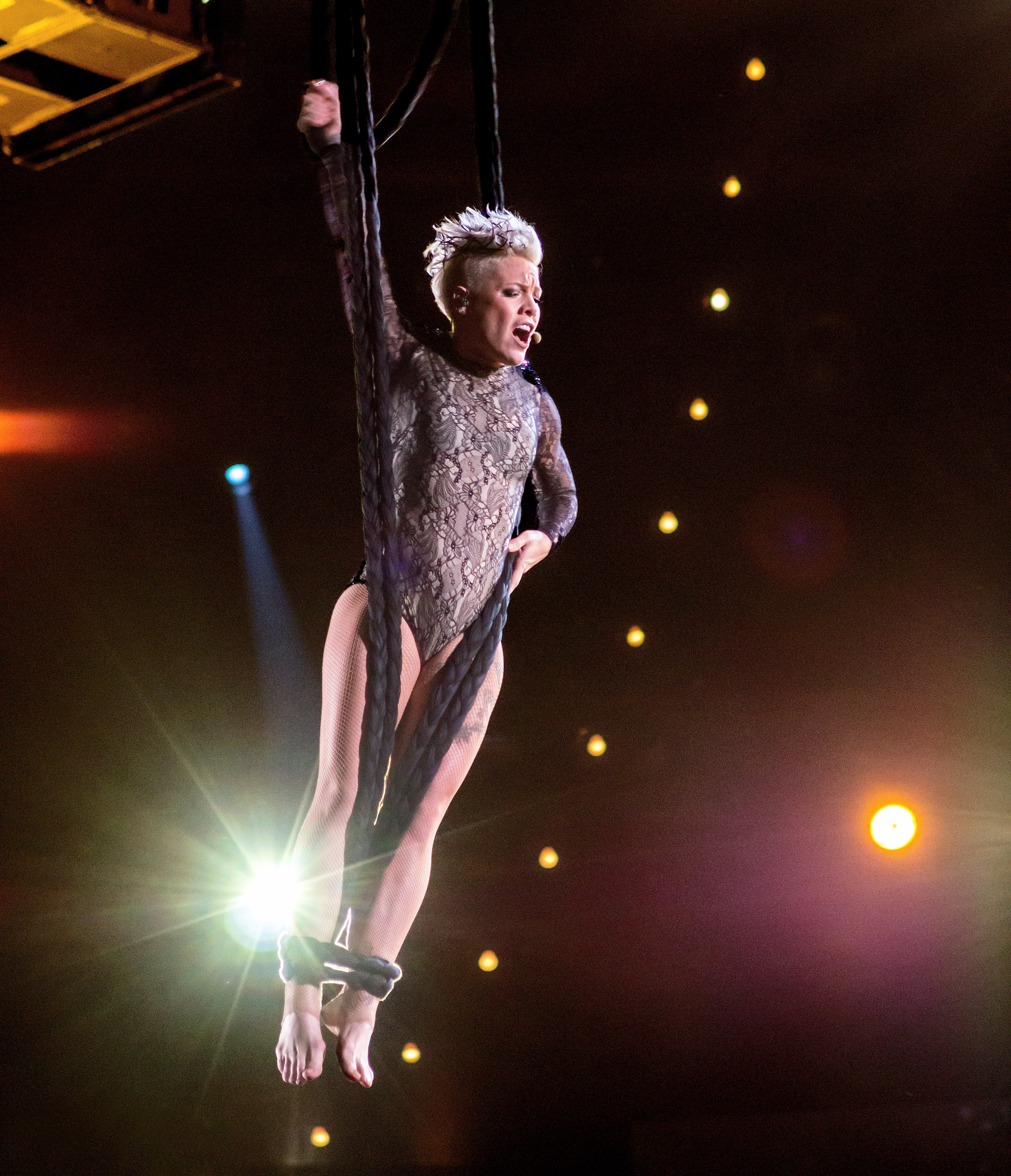
Pink during her acrobatic performance of "Try" at the 56th Annual Grammy Awards

To bolster album sales, Pink and RCA Records implemented an extensive marketing plan for the album. At the 2012 MTV Video Music Awards, Pink gave the first televised performance of "Blow Me (One Last Kiss)", which she also performed on September 10, 2012, on The Ellen DeGeneres Show and Le Grand Journal. Three days later, Pink sang at the 2012 iTunes Festival at Roundhouse, in London. On September 14, 2012, Pink appeared on Alan Carr: Chatty Man, where she was interviewed and performed "Blow Me (One Last Kiss)". Concurrent with the album's release in Germany, Pink held a special concert at Circus Krone, in Munich. Songs performed included "Are We All We Are", "How Come You're Not Here?", "True Love", "Try", "Blow Me (One Last Kiss)", and "Slut Like You", along with other tracks from her discography. She later performed "Blow Me (One Last Kiss)" and "Try" on Today as part of their Toyota Concert Series. Pink also appeared on The View and The Daily Show singing "Blow Me (One Last Kiss)". Later the same month, the singer performed at the 2012 iHeartRadio Music Festival where her setlist included "Blow Me (One Last Kiss)" and "Try".

In Australia, Pink promoted The Truth About Love by performing "Blow Me (One Last Kiss)" and "True Love" on Today. She also performed "Try" during the fourth season of The X Factor Australia and held a one-night-only concert at the Forum Theatre, in Melbourne. On November 12, 2012, she performed during the "Power of Pink" benefit concert at Sony Pictures Studios, singing her previous singles as well as "How Come You're Not Here?", "Try", and "Blow Me (One Last Kiss)". A day later, Pink was featured on an episode of VH1 Storytellers. Her setlist included "Blow Me (One Last Kiss)", "How Come You're Not Here?", and she was accompanied on stage by Lily Allen and Nate Ruess during the performances of "True Love" and "Just Give Me a Reason", respectively. At the 2012 American Music Awards, Pink performed "Try" and recreated the highly choreographed routine from the music video joined by her male dancer, Colt Prattes. The performance was met with positive reviews from critics.

Pink then returned to Europe to further promote the album. On November 30, 2012, Pink played a private concert organized by NRJ at Salle Wagram in Paris. The following day, she appeared on Swiss television show Benissimo and sang "Try". Pink performed the song again on the semi-finale of the ninth series of The X Factor UK. On December 8, 2012, she performed "Try" on German television show Wetten, dass..?, accompanied by Prattes. The singer was a main headliner at the 2012 edition of Jingle Bell Ball, an annually-held event promoted by Capital FM, which took place at the O_{2} Arena in London. Among the songs performed were "Blow Me (One Last Kiss)" and "Try". She later performed "Try" on The Graham Norton Show, in an appearance aired on December 31, 2012. At the 56th Annual Grammy Awards on January 26, 2014, Pink performed a medley of "Try" and "Just Give Me a Reason". Pink descended from the ceiling on ropes and performed "Try" while flying above the audience and executing an aerial dancing routine. She then landed on stage and sang "Just Give Me a Reason" joined by Nate Ruess.

=== Singles ===
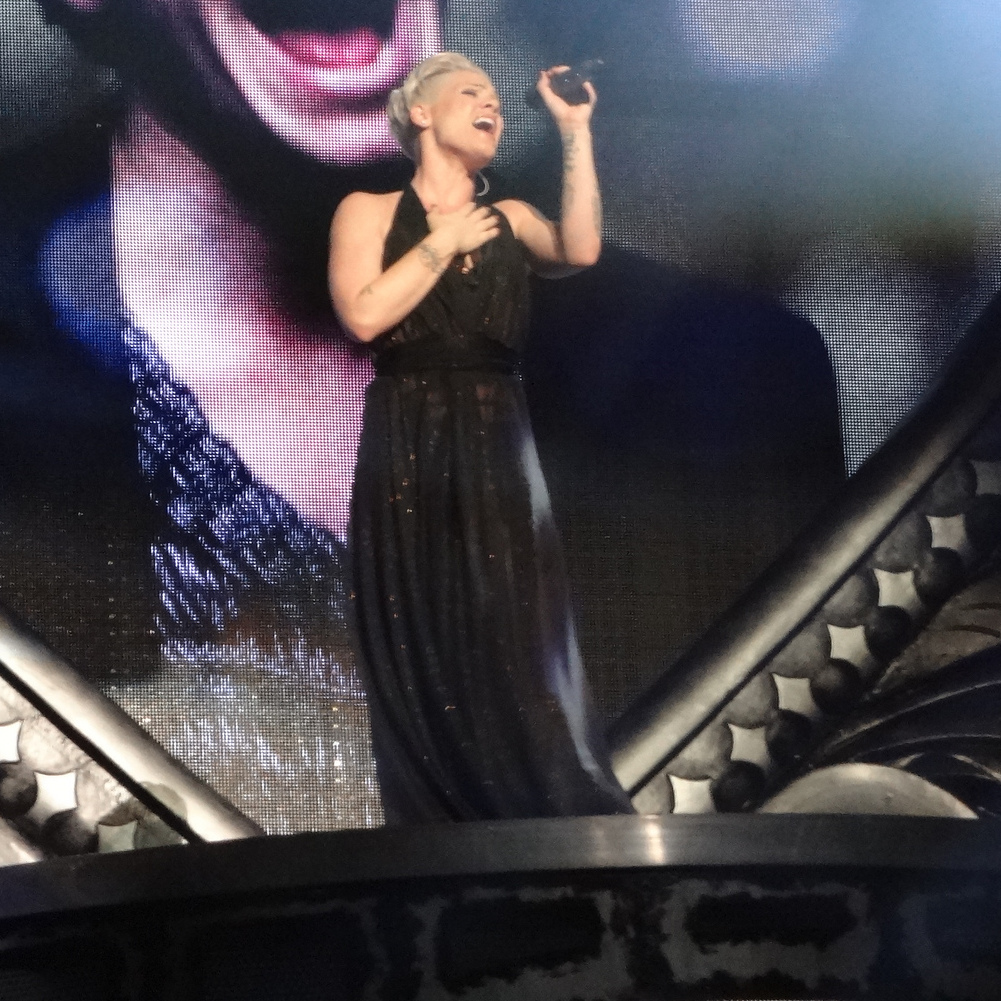
Pink performing "Just Give Me a Reason", the album's third single, on The Truth About Love Tour. The song became her fourth number one on the Billboard Hot 100.

The album's lead single, "Blow Me (One Last Kiss)" was released on July 2, 2012, a week ahead of schedule due to a demo leaking onto the Internet. It received positive commentary from music critics; reviewers complimented Pink's vocals and the song's anthemic chorus, being heralded as a return to form. The single topped the charts in Australia and Hungary while reaching a peak of number five on the Billboard Hot 100. An accompanying music video, directed by Dave Meyers, was released on July 26, 2012. It depicts Pink taking revenge and crashing the wedding of a former lover.

"Try" was released as the album's second single on September 6, 2012. The song attained top ten status in the United States and other 15 countries, including Australia, Canada, Germany, and the United Kingdom. Its music video was directed by Floria Sigismondi and choreographed by the GoldenBoyz and Sebastien Stella. Released on October 10, 2012, the video portrays Pink and her lover, played by Prattes, expressing their intense love story and frustrations through an elaborate choreography inspired by the Apache dance.

"Just Give Me a Reason" was released as the third single from the album, on February 26, 2013. The song was a commercial success, topping the charts in over ten countries and reaching the top ten elsewhere. In the United States, "Just Give Me a Reason" spent three consecutive weeks at number one on the Billboard Hot 100 chart, becoming Pink's fourth number-one single in the country. The accompanying music video, directed by Diane Martel, is mainly set on a floating mattress surrounded by mist and water and features a cameo from Pink's husband.

The album's fourth single, "True Love", was released on June 28, 2013. The song performed moderately on the charts, peaking within the top 40 charts in over 15 countries, including Australia, Canada, and Italy. An accompanying music video showing scenes of Pink playing, fighting, and riding bicycles with her family, interspersed with clips from a tour performance, was released on July 1, 2013. "Walk of Shame" was serviced to Australian contemporary hit radio stations on September 25, 2013, as the album's fifth single. The song's music video consists of a compilation of concert and behind-the-scenes footage from The Truth About Love Tour. In Europe, "Are We All We Are" was released as the final single from The Truth About Love on October 31, 2013.

=== Tour ===
The album received further promotion from The Truth About Love Tour, which started on February 13, 2013, in Phoenix, Arizona. The first leg consisted of 26 dates, visiting venues in North America, while the second row of shows comprised 30 concerts throughout Europe. The third leg included 46 dates in Australia and ran from June to September. Pink played an additional 40 shows in North America, which commenced on October 10, 2013, and concluded on January 31, 2014. The tour garnered positive reviews, with critics commending her vocals, stage presence, and aerial acrobatics. It became the third highest-grossing tour of 2013 and grossed a total of $183 million with over 1.9 million ticket sales. A video album of the tour was released on November 15, 2013, as DVD, Blu-ray, and digital download.

== Critical reception ==
Professional ratings
Aggregate scores
Source	Rating
AnyDecentMusic?	6.3/10
Metacritic	77/100
Review scores
Source	Rating
AllMusic	4.5/5 stars
The A.V. Club	B−
Billboard	4.5/5 stars
Chicago Tribune	2.5/4 stars
Entertainment Weekly	A
The Guardian	4/5 stars
MSN Music (Expert Witness)	A
Rolling Stone	3/5 stars
Slant Magazine	3/5 stars
Spin	7/10

The Truth About Love was met with generally positive reviews. At Metacritic, which assigns a normalized rating out of 100 to reviews from mainstream publications, the album received an average score of 77, based on 16 reviews. Aggregator AnyDecentMusic? gave the album 6.3 out of 10, based on their assessment of the critical consensus.

Kyle Anderson of Entertainment Weekly commended the songs' confessional nature, describing the record as "honesty you can dance to". In a positive review for MSN Music, Robert Christgau viewed that, apart from its last two songs, the album "hit[s] every time" and summarized it as "a recorded image of [Pink's] feisty, heartfelt, all-over-the-place love/sex life". Stephen Thomas Erlewine from AllMusic applauded the album for "expanding and deepening [Pink's] music without succumbing to stuffy pretension", calling it "weird and willfully, proudly human". Robert Copsey of Digital Spy deemed The Truth About Love as a "fierce and thoroughly entertaining record". Billboard's Andrew Hampp rated the record 4.5 out of 5 stars and hailed it as being a "peerlessly witty, endlessly melodic tour de force".

Caryn Ganz of Spin compared the album favorably to Stronger (2011) by Kelly Clarkson, stating that both records "are stocked with confidence-jolting up-tempo jams, broken-hearted weepers, and candid explorations of their own flaws". Ganz also remarked that both singers "have dug in their heels even harder for guitar pop", as opposed to following current musical trends. The Boston Globe's writer Sarah Rodman praised the album for juxtaposing "rock muscle, pop froth, and expressions both heartfelt and petulant". Jon Pareles of The New York Times found the recording to be "[recognizing] some nonstorybook sides of romance". Writing for The Guardian, Caroline Sullivan noted that the singer "funnels her thoughts into some of the most pungent songs in pop" and commended her for having "the nous to convert raw emotion into pop-punk earworms". However, she criticized the ballads which "detract from an otherwise fierce record".

Hermoine Hoby of The Observer favored its "workmanlike ballads delivered with beyond-workmanlike shading" over its "chunky guitar pop stuffed with shouty, bad-girl choruses", which she considered dominant on the album. Greg Kot of the Chicago Tribune perceived "formula production and hack songwriting", but complimented Pink's personality showcased in its "handful" of worthy tracks. Jody Rosen, writing for Rolling Stone, viewed The Truth About Love as "supercatchy", although he opined that the album "devolves into self parody" as "Pink strains to shock, peppering songs with gratuitous curse words". Sal Cinquemani from Slant Magazine gave the album a mixed review, rating it three out of five stars. He felt that the record was formulaic and denounced it as "competently, often frustratingly more of the same from an artist who still seems capable of much more".

=== Accolades ===
Spin listed the album at number 11 on their list of best pop albums released in 2012, with editor Ganz noting that Pink "got over her pop-star identity crisis" and presented her "genuine" side. In his list for The Barnes & Noble Review, Christgau named The Truth About Love the fourth best album of 2012. Billboard ranked it as one of the best albums of the 2010s decade, with reviewer Sarah Grant affirming that Pink "created a ramshackle masterpiece that reminds us of what it's really like to be human" by "figuring out how the foreign experiences of a family-woman fit into [her] repertoire". The album was nominated for Best Pop Vocal Album at the 55th Annual Grammy Awards, while "Just Give Me a Reason" received nominations for Song of the Year and Best Pop Duo/Group Performance, respectively, at the 56th ceremony. In Canada, the album was nominated for International Album of the Year at the Juno Awards of 2014.

== Commercial performance ==
The Truth About Love became Pink's first number-one album in the United States, debuting at the summit of the Billboard 200 chart with 280,000 copies sold and earning her biggest first-week sales at the time. The following week, the album fell to number four with sales of 94,000 copies. It sold 945,000 copies by the end of 2012, finishing as the country's 12th highest-selling album of the year. By December 2013, the album had sold over 1.83 million copies. It was certified 3× Platinum by the Recording Industry Association of America (RIAA) in August 2017 for selling over three million album-equivalent units in the US. In Canada, The Truth About Love debuted atop the Canadian Albums Chart. With 28,000 copies sold in the first week, it became Pink's first number-one album there. It was certified 3× Platinum by Music Canada (MC) for shipments of 240,000 copies.

In the United Kingdom, The Truth About Love entered the UK Albums Chart at number two, selling 80,000 copies, behind The Killers' Battle Born which sold 94,000 copies. As of February 2019, the album has sold 907,000 sales in the UK and has been certified 3× Platinum by the British Phonographic Industry (BPI). In France, it debuted at number four on the official album chart with 17,855 traditional units. The Syndicat National de l'Édition Phonographique (SNEP) certified the album gold, which denotes sales of 50,000 copies. In other regions, The Truth About Love reached number one on charts in Austria, Germany, Sweden, and Switzerland, and peaked within the top ten in Denmark, Italy, the Netherlands, and Spain, among others.

In Australia, The Truth About Love debuted at number one on the ARIA Albums Chart with first-week sales of 74,293 copies, becoming Pink's fourth number-one album in the country and claiming the biggest single-week sales of 2012. The album spent ten non-consecutive weeks at the summit of the chart, becoming the longest-running number-one album since Adele's 21 (2011). The Truth About Love was the nation's highest-selling album of both 2012 and 2013, thus becoming the first album to ever achieve this feat. As of January 2014, it has sold 560,000 copies and was certified 9× Platinum by the Australian Recording Industry Association (ARIA) for selling over 630,000 units. The album experienced similar success in New Zealand, debuting at the top of the Official New Zealand Music Chart and spending six non-consecutive weeks there. It received a 4× Platinum certification from Recorded Music NZ (RMNZ) for shipments of over 60,000 units. Globally, The Truth About Love was the seventh best-selling album of 2012, with sales of 2.6 million copies, and by November 2016, it had sold an estimated seven million copies worldwide.

== Track listing ==
The Truth About Love – Standard edition
No.	Title	Writer(s)	Producer(s)	Length
1.	"Are We All We Are"	Pink; Butch Walker; John Hill; Emile Haynie	Walker; Hill; Haynie	3:37
2.	"Blow Me (One Last Kiss)"	Pink; Greg Kurstin	Kurstin	4:16
3.	"Try"	Busbee; Ben West	Kurstin	4:07
4.	"Just Give Me a Reason" (featuring Nate Ruess)	Pink; Ruess; Jeff Bhasker	Bhasker	4:02
5.	"True Love" (featuring Lily Rose Cooper)	Pink; Allen; Kurstin	Kurstin	3:50
6.	"How Come You're Not Here?"	Pink; Kurstin	Kurstin	3:12
7.	"Slut Like You"	Pink; Max Martin; Shellback	Martin; Shellback	3:42
8.	"The Truth About Love"	Pink; Billy Mann; David Schuler	Mann; Schuler^{[a]}	3:50
9.	"Beam Me Up"	Pink; Mann	Mann	4:27
10.	"Walk of Shame"	Pink; Kurstin	Kurstin	2:42
11.	"Here Comes the Weekend" (featuring Eminem)	Pink; Khalil Abdul Rahman; Pranam Injeti; Erik Alcock; Liz Rodrigues; Marshall Mathers	DJ Khalil; Chin Injeti; John Brown^{[b]}	4:24
12.	"Where Did the Beat Go?"	Pink; Mann; Jon Keep; Steve Daly	Mann; Tracklacers^{[b]}	4:18
13.	"The Great Escape"	Pink; Dan Wilson	Wilson	4:24
Total length:				50:49

The Truth About Love – US and Canadian iTunes Store edition (bonus tracks)
No.	Title	Writer(s)	Producers	Length
14.	"Chaos & Piss"	Pink; Francis White	Eg White	3:59
15.	"Timebomb"	Pink; Kurstin	Kurstin	3:34
Total length:				58:22

The Truth About Love – US Target and international deluxe edition (bonus tracks)
No.	Title	Writer(s)	Producers	Length
14.	"My Signature Move"	Pink; Walker; Jake Sinclair	Walker	3:44
15.	"Is This Thing On?"	Pink; Walker; Sinclair	Walker	4:21
16.	"Run"	Pink; Walker; Sinclair	Walker	4:11
17.	"Good Old Days"	Pink; Mann; Schuler	Mann; Schuler^{[a]}	4:02
Total length:				67:07

The Truth About Love – Japanese edition (bonus track)
No.	Title	Writer(s)	Producers	Length
18.	"The King Is Dead but the Queen Is Alive"	Pink; Mann; Walker; Niklas "Nikey" Olovson; Robin Lynch	Mann; Machopsycho; Walker	3:44
Total length:				70:51

The Truth About Love – International iTunes Store deluxe edition (bonus tracks)
No.	Title	Writer(s)	Producers	Length
18.	"Chaos & Piss"	Pink; White	White	3:59
19.	"Timebomb"	Pink; Kurstin	Kurstin	3:34
Total length:				74:40

The Truth About Love – Fan edition (bonus track)
No.	Title	Writer(s)	Producers	Length
20.	"The King Is Dead but the Queen Is Alive"	Pink; Mann; Walker; Olovson; Lynch	Mann; Machopsycho; Walker	3:44
Total length:				78:24

The Truth About Love – Fan edition (bonus disc)
No.	Title	Length
1.	"Blow Me (One Last Kiss)" (Music video)	3:47
2.	"Try" (Music video)	4:09
3.	"Are We All We Are" (live from Los Angeles)	3:52
4.	"Blow Me (One Last Kiss)" (live from Los Angeles)	4:39
5.	"Try" (live from Los Angeles)	4:30
6.	"F**kin' Perfect" (live from Los Angeles)	3:33
7.	"The Truth About Love Photoshoot" (Behind the Scenes)	3:43

=== Notes ===
- ^a signifies a co-producer
- ^b signifies an additional producer

== Credits and personnel ==
Credits are adapted from the liner notes of The Truth About Love.

Studios

Recording locations

- Earthstar Creation Center (Venice, California)
- Conway Studios (Los Angeles)
- Suite 203
- Effigy Studios (Ferndale, Michigan)
- The Modern Dirt laboratories (London)
- Fishhead Music (Gothenburg, Sweden)
- Ruby Red Studios (Santa Monica, California)
- West Triad Studios (Venice, California)
- Echo Studios (Los Angeles, CA)

Additional recording locations

- Enormous Studios – guitars recording
- Capitol Studios (Hollywood) – strings recording

Engineering locations

- Earthstar Creation Center (Venice, California)
- Ruby Red Studios (Santa Monica, California)
- Sonora Recorders (Los Angeles)
- Echo Studio (Los Angeles)
- Modern World Studios (Tetbury)
- Turtle Sound Studios (Weston, Connecticut)
- Monster Island (Nashville, Tennessee)
- New Track City (London/Los Angeles)
- Ballroom West (Los Angeles)
- Mission Sound (Brooklyn)

Mixing and mastering locations

- Eldorado Recording Studios (Los Angeles)
- MixStar Studios (Virginia Beach, Virginia)
- The Ballroom Studio (Los Angeles)
- Super Sonic Scale (France)
- Ruby Red Studios (Santa Monica, California)

Musicians

- Pink – lead vocals, background vocals
- Butch Walker – background vocals, arranger
- Phillip A. Peterson – strings
- Zachary Baird – keyboards
- Greg Kurstin – keyboards, guitar, bass, piano
- Kevin Dukes – guitars
- Jeff Bhasker – keyboards, synthesizer
- Nate Ruess – featured vocals
- Anders Mouridsen – guitars
- Lily Rose Cooper – featured vocals
- Willow Sage Hart – bells, bass
- Max Martin – keyboards, background vocals
- Shellback – guitars, bass, drums, keyboards, background vocals
- Billy Mann – arranger, acoustic guitars, electric guitars, bass, piano, live percussion
- David Schuler – arranger, acoustic guitars, electric guitars, bass, drums
- Jonathan Yudkin – strings
- Eminem – featured vocals
- Erik Alcock – guitars
- Chin Injeti – bass
- DJ Khalil – keyboards
- Danny Keyz – keyboards
- Liz Rodrigues – background vocals
- Tracklacers – arranger, bass, keyboards
- Pete Wallace – string arrangements
- Dan Wilson – piano, acoustic guitar, keyboards
- Steve Wolf – tambourine
- David Campbell – string arrangements, conducting
- Charlie Bisharat – strings concertmaster
- Sara Parkins – violin
- Tamara Hatwan – violin
- Andrew Duckels – viola
- Steve Richards – cello
- Dave Stone – bass
- Oli Kraus – additional cello, viola, violin
- Jake Sinclair – background vocals
- Boyce Buchanan – children's vocal
- Barbara Klaskin Silberg – children's vocal directing
- Eg White – instruments, background vocals
- Robin Lynch – electric guitars
- Niklas "Nikey" Olovson – bass
- Mark Shulman – drums
- Justin Derrico – lead electric guitars

Production

- Butch Walker – producer, music, songwriting, keyboard programming
- John Hill – producer, music, songwriting
- Emile Haynie – producer, music, songwriting
- Jake Sinclair – music, engineer
- Pink – songwriting, executive producer
- Laura Sisk – engineer
- Rich Costey – mixing
- Chris Kasych – Pro Tools engineer
- Eric Isip – assistant engineered for mix
- Greg Kurstin – songwriting, producer, programming, engineer, mixing
- Jesse Shatkin – additional engineering
- Serban Ghenea – mixing
- John Hanes – engineered for mix
- Phil Seaford – assistant engineered for mix
- Busbee – songwriting
- Ben West – songwriting
- Jeff Bhasker – songwriting, producer, programming
- Nate Ruess – songwriting
- John X Volaitis – recording, assistant vocal recording
- Pawel Sek – guitars recording
- Tyler Johnson – guitars recording
- Tony Maserati – mixing
- Justin Hergett – assistant engineered for mix
- James Krausse – assistant engineered for mix
- Lily Rose Cooper – songwriting
- Max Martin – songwriting, producer
- Shellback – songwriting, producer, programming
- Sam Holland – recording
- Billy Mann – songwriting, producer, drum programming, engineer, keyboard programming
- David Schuler – songwriting, additional production, drum programming, engineer, keyboard programming
- Mark Needham – mixing
- Will Brierre – assistant engineered for mix
- Pete Wallace – engineer
- Veronica Ferraro – mixing
- DJ Khalil – songwriting, producer
- Chin Injeti – songwriting, producer
- John Brown – additional production
- Mike Strange – vocal recording
- Jon Keep – songwriting
- Steve Daly – songwriting
- Tracklacers – additional production, drum programming
- Jonathan Yudkin – engineer
- Dan Wilson – songwriting, producer
- John Rausch – engineer
- Phil Allen – engineer
- Oliver Straus – engineer
- Charlie Paakkari – strings recording
- Eg White – songwriting, producer, engineer, programming
- Tom Coyne – mastering
- Machopsycho – producer, keyboard programming, engineer
- Niklas "Nikey" Olovson – songwriting
- Robin Lynch – songwriting
- Pete Wallace – keyboard programming

Management and design

- Roger Davies – management
- Shady Farshadfar – management
- Irene Taylor – management
- Lisa Garrett – management
- Andrew Macpherson – photography
- Deborah Anderson – photography
- Jeri Heiden – art direction, designing
- Nick Steinhardt – art direction, designing
- Donald Passman – legal
- Gene Solomon – legal
- Helen Stotler – legal
- Nancy Chapman – business affairs
- Teresa Polyak – business affairs
- Otto Perez – business affairs

== Charts ==
=== Weekly charts ===
Weekly chart performance for The Truth About Love
Chart (2012–2013)	Peak position
Australian Albums (ARIA)	1
Austrian Albums (Ö3 Austria)	1
Belgian Albums (Ultratop Flanders)	3
Belgian Albums (Ultratop Wallonia)	4
Canadian Albums (Billboard)	1
Croatian International Albums (HDU)	4
Czech Albums (ČNS IFPI)	5
Danish Albums (Hitlisten)	4
Dutch Albums (Album Top 100)	2
Finnish Albums (Suomen virallinen lista)	4
French Albums (SNEP)	4
German Albums (Offizielle Top 100)	1
Hungarian Albums (MAHASZ)	3
Irish Albums (IRMA)	2
Italian Albums (FIMI)	4
Japanese Albums (Oricon)	14
Mexican Albums (Top 100 Mexico)	14
New Zealand Albums (RMNZ)	1
Norwegian Albums (VG-lista)	4
Polish Albums (ZPAV)	24
Portuguese Albums (AFP)	8
Russian Albums (Tophit)	6
Scottish Albums (Official Charts)	2
South African Albums (RISA)	4
South Korean Albums (Gaon)	30
South Korean International Albums (Gaon)	5
Spanish Albums (Promusicae)	10
Swedish Albums (Sverigetopplistan)	1
Swiss Albums (Schweizer Hitparade)	1
UK Albums (Official Charts)	2
US Billboard 200	1
US Indie Store Album Sales (Billboard)	7

=== Year-end charts ===
2012 year-end chart performance for The Truth About Love
Chart (2012)	Position
Australian Albums (ARIA)	1
Austrian Albums (Ö3 Austria)	24
Belgian Albums (Ultratop Flanders)	63
Belgian Albums (Ultratop Wallonia)	65
Canadian Albums (Billboard)	24
Danish Albums (Hitlisten)	59
Dutch Albums (Album Top 100)	41
Finnish Albums (Suomen virallinen lista)	26
French Albums (SNEP)	55
German Albums (Offizielle Top 100)	13
Hungarian Albums (MAHASZ)	58
Italian Albums (FIMI)	91
New Zealand Albums (RMNZ)	10
Russian Albums (Tophit)	39
Swedish Albums (Sverigetopplistan)	71
Swiss Albums (Schweizer Hitparade)	9
UK Albums (OCC)	12
US Billboard 200	37
Worldwide Albums (IFPI)	6

2013 year-end chart performance for The Truth About Love
Chart (2013)	Position
Australian Albums (ARIA)	1
Austrian Albums (Ö3 Austria)	6
Belgian Albums (Ultratop Flanders)	24
Belgian Albums (Ultratop Wallonia)	57
Canadian Albums (Billboard)	3
Danish Albums (Hitlisten)	31
Dutch Albums (Album Top 100)	9
French Albums (SNEP)	37
German Albums (Offizielle Top 100)	11
Hungarian Albums (MAHASZ)	55
Irish Albums (IRMA)	12
Italian Albums (FIMI)	35
Mexican Albums (Top 100 Mexico)	41
New Zealand Albums (RMNZ)	4
Spanish Albums (PROMUSICAE)	40
Swedish Albums (Sverigetopplistan)	64
Swiss Albums (Schweizer Hitparade)	4
UK Albums (OCC)	20
US Billboard 200	8
US Digital Albums (Billboard)	14

2014 year-end chart performance for The Truth About Love
Chart (2014)	Position
New Zealand Albums (RMNZ)	50
US Billboard 200	97

=== Decade-end charts ===
Decade-end chart performance for The Truth About Love
Chart (2010–19)	Position
Australian Albums (ARIA)	6
Austrian Albums (Ö3 Austria)	40
Dutch Albums (Album Top 100)	42
German Albums (Offizielle Top 100)	40
UK Albums (OCC)	59
US Billboard 200	43

=== All-time charts ===
All-time chart performance for The Truth About Love
Chart	Position
US Billboard 200 (Women)	57

== Certifications and sales ==
Certifications and sales for The Truth About Love
Region	Certification	Certified units/sales
Australia (ARIA)	9× Platinum	630,000^{^}
Austria (IFPI Austria)	Platinum	20,000^{*}
Brazil (Pro-Música Brasil)	2× Platinum	80,000^{‡}
Canada (Music Canada)	6× Platinum	480,000^{‡}
Denmark (IFPI Danmark)	2× Platinum	40,000^{‡}
Finland (Musiikkituottajat)	Gold	15,084
France (SNEP)	Gold	150,000
Germany (BVMI)	3× Platinum	600,000^{‡}
Hungary (MAHASZ)	Gold	3,000^{^}
Ireland (IRMA)	Platinum	15,000^{^}
Italy (FIMI)	Platinum	60,000^{*}
Mexico (AMPROFON)	3× Platinum	180,000^{‡}
New Zealand (RMNZ)	6× Platinum	90,000^{‡}
Poland (ZPAV)	2× Platinum	40,000^{*}
Spain (Promusicae)	Gold	20,000^{^}
Sweden (GLF)	Platinum	40,000^{‡}
Switzerland (IFPI Switzerland)	Platinum	30,000^{^}
United Kingdom (BPI)	3× Platinum	900,000
United States (RIAA)	3× Platinum	3,000,000^{‡}
^{*} Sales figures based on certification alone.^{^} Shipments figures based on certification alone.^{‡} Sales+streaming figures based on certification alone.

== Release history ==
Release dates and formats for The Truth About Love
Region	Date	Edition(s)	Format(s)	Label	Ref.
Australia	September 14, 2012	Standard; deluxe	CD; digital download; LP	Sony Music Australia	
Denmark	September 14, 2012	Standard; deluxe	Digital download	RCA Records	
France	September 14, 2012	Standard; deluxe	Digital download	RCA Records	
Germany	September 14, 2012	Standard; deluxe	CD; digital download; LP	RCA Records	
Ireland	September 14, 2012	Standard; deluxe	CD; digital download	RCA Records	
Japan	September 14, 2012	Standard; deluxe	Digital download	RCA Records	
Netherlands	September 14, 2012	Standard; deluxe	CD; digital download; LP	RCA Records	
Switzerland	September 14, 2012	Standard; deluxe	CD; digital download	RCA Records	
Denmark	September 17, 2012	Standard; deluxe	CD; LP	Sony Music	
France	September 17, 2012	Standard; deluxe	CD; LP	Sony Music	
United Kingdom	September 17, 2012	Standard; deluxe	CD; digital download	RCA Records	
Canada	September 18, 2012	Standard; Target edition	CD; digital download	RCA Records	
United States	September 18, 2012	Standard; Target edition	CD; digital download	RCA Records	
Mexico	September 18, 2012	Standard	CD; digital download	RCA Records	
Japan	October 3, 2012	Japanese edition	CD	Sony Music Japan	
Germany	November 30, 2012	Fan edition	CD+DVD	RCA Records	
France	December 3, 2012	Fan edition	CD+DVD	RCA Records	
Netherlands	December 3, 2012	Fan edition	CD+DVD	RCA Records	
Various	May 4, 2018	Standard	LP	Legacy Recordings	

== See also ==
- List of Billboard 200 number-one albums of 2012
- List of number-one albums of 2012 (Australia)
- List of number-one albums of 2013 (Australia)
- List of number-one hits of 2012 (Austria)
- List of number-one albums of 2012 (Canada)
- List of number-one albums from the 2010s (New Zealand)
- List of best-selling albums of the 2010s in the United Kingdom
- List of number-one singles and albums in Sweden
- List of number-one hits of 2012 (Switzerland)
