= True Love (Pink song) =

Single by Pink featuring Lily Allen

from the album The Truth About Love
- B-side: "Slut Like You"
- Released: June 28, 2013
- Recorded: 2012
- Studio: Earthstar Creation Center (Venice, California); Echo Studio (Los Feliz, California); Modern World Studios (Gloucestershire, England)
- Genre: Pop
- Length: 3:50
- Label: RCA
- Songwriters: Alecia Moore; Greg Kurstin; Lily Rose Cooper
- Producer: Greg Kurstin

Pink singles chronology
"Just Give Me a Reason" (2013)	"True Love" (2013)	"Walk of Shame" (2013)

Lily Allen singles chronology
"5 O'Clock" (2011)	"True Love" (2013)	"Somewhere Only We Know" (2013)

Music video
- "True Love" on YouTube

"True Love" is a song by American singer Pink featuring British singer Lily Allen from the former's sixth studio album, The Truth About Love (2012). It was written by the artists, and producer Greg Kurstin.

The song was released as the album's second promotional single, following "Are We All We Are", in early 2013. It was released exclusively to Hungarian and Dutch radio. On April 29, 2013, it was announced that the song would be released as the fourth single. It officially impacted Italian radio stations on June 28, 2013. In the US, it impacted Hot/Modern/AC radio on July 15, 2013, before impacting Top 40/Mainstream radio one week later on July 23, 2013. The song was released in the UK on July 22, 2013. The song reached the top 10 in Australia, the Czech Republic, Lebanon, Slovakia, Slovenia, and South Africa.

== Background ==
In late February 2012, Pink tweeted that she was currently in the studio, working on an upcoming studio album. In early June, she released a video saying that her first single from the album was to be called "Blow Me (One Last Kiss)". It was released in July. Her new album was named The Truth About Love and was released in September. Since then, Pink has released two other singles from the album: "Try", and "Just Give Me a Reason". Pink says that the song is about her relationship with Carey Hart and she finds the song funny lyrically.

== Critical reception ==
The song received mostly positive reviews from critics and was compared to the album's title track due to both songs revealing the positive and negative aspects of love. In its review of The Truth About Love, Billboard called the song the album's "brightest moment" and added that it "deserves to be one of Pink's signature songs". Amy Sciarretto of PopCrush also gave a positive review of the song, saying, "The upbeat, hell yeah, high-five love song features Pink calling her lover an “a–hole” and saying she wants to slap his whole face. Again, a dysfunctional relationship, which is sung about over a resonant rhythm, makes the misery of love sound like a delight in Pink’s capable hands, er, voice." MSN Music also reacted positively to the song, calling it "feisty".

The New York Times complimented the song, as well as the album's title track, for recognizing "some nonstorybook sides of romance", and further praised "True Love" for being "bouncy" and upbeat. The Chicago Tribune gave a more critical review of the song, calling Allen's vocals "strangely subdued" and added that Allen was "tamping down Pink's strident, comical posturing". They also wrote that the collaboration "should've been a dream pairing, but falls flat". PopMatters also gave the song a mixed review, sarcastically complimenting the song, as well as the title track, for "daring to reveal the truth about love", and describing the album as "Brave, honest stuff—that’s already been covered in millions of other songs.".

== Music video ==
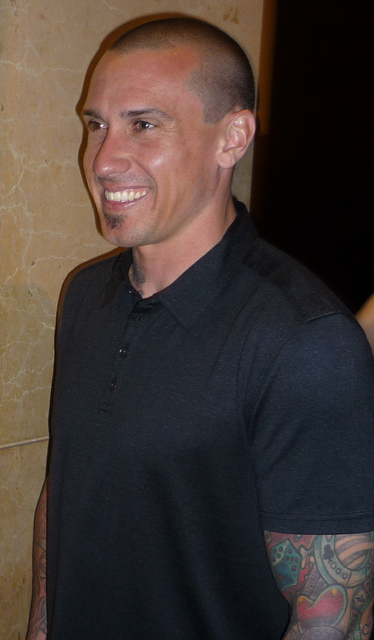
Pink's husband, Carey Hart (pictured) makes a cameo appearance in the music video

According to Pink's official Facebook page, the music video for "True Love" was planned to premiere on July 1, 2013. The video was leaked online on June 30, on the website Direct Lyrics; however, a few hours later the video was released to her official VEVO account, a day earlier than planned.

The video directed by Sophie Muller (who also directed videos for "Trouble" and "I Don't Believe You") features Pink, her husband Carey Hart and her 2-year-old daughter Willow. It is the fourth music video that Hart appears alongside P!nk. The video is a melody of flashing and swirling colors. Pink stated that she had no time for a dramatic music video, (like her previous videos for "Just Give Me a Reason" and "Try", which show Pink's emotional and dramatic side) due to her being on her sold-out worldwide tour, backstage footage of which is featured in the video. Lily Allen was filmed separately, and during her short part in the song she is shown cutting vegetables and throwing them into a blender.

== Covers and performances ==
- Joanne Hadjia, a contestant on the fifth season of The X Factor Australia, performed the song in the fourth week of live performances, only to be met with negative comments from both the public and the judges, from whom Ronan Keating criticised her mentor, Redfoo, for "letting her coast with boring songs".

== Track listing ==
- Digital download
1. "True Love" (featuring Lily Allen)
- CD single
1. "True Love” (featuring Lily Allen)
2. "Slut Like You" (Live from Los Angeles)

== Credits and personnel ==
- Pink – Songwriter, vocals
- Lily Allen – Songwriter, vocals
- Greg Kurstin – Songwriter, producer, mixer, keyboards, guitar, bass, programmer, engineer
- Jesse Shatkin – additional engineer

Credits adapted from The Truth About Love album liner notes.

== Charts ==
=== Weekly charts ===
Weekly chart performance for "True Love"
Chart (2013)	Peak position
Australia (ARIA)	5
Austria (Ö3 Austria Top 40)	30
Belgium (Ultratip Bubbling Under Flanders)	3
Belgium (Ultratip Bubbling Under Wallonia)	4
Canada Hot 100 (Billboard)	20
CIS Airplay (TopHit)	159
Croatia International Airplay (HRT)	4
Czech Republic Airplay (ČNS IFPI)	5
Finland Radio (Suomen virallinen radiosoittolista)	2
France (SNEP)	52
France Airplay (SNEP)	6
Germany (GfK)	43
Hungary (Rádiós Top 40)	33
Iceland (RÚV)	12
Ireland (IRMA)	23
Italy (FIMI)	32
Lebanon (Lebanese Top 20)	5
Netherlands (Dutch Top 40)	19
Netherlands (Single Top 100)	57
New Zealand (Recorded Music NZ)	14
Poland (Polish Airplay New)	1
Romania (Airplay 100)	22
Russia Airplay (TopHit)	192
Scottish Singles Sales (Official Charts)	11
Slovakia Airplay (ČNS IFPI)	10
Slovenia Airplay (SloTop50)	5
South Africa Airplay (EMA)	7
Switzerland (Schweizer Hitparade)	50
Ukraine Airplay (TopHit)	122
UK Singles (Official Charts)	16
US Billboard Hot 100	53
US Adult Contemporary (Billboard)	13
US Adult Pop Airplay (Billboard)	4
US Pop Airplay (Billboard)	22

=== Year-end charts ===
Year-end chart performance for "True Love"
Chart (2013)	Position
Australia (ARIA)	79
Canada (Canadian Hot 100)	73
Croatia International Airplay (HRT)	47
Netherlands (Dutch Top 40)	87
Slovenia (SloTop50)	12
Ukraine Airplay (TopHit)	162
US Adult Top 40 (Billboard)	25

== Certifications ==
Certifications and sales for "True Love"
Region	Certification	Certified units/sales
Australia (ARIA)	4× Platinum	280,000^{‡}
Brazil (Pro-Música Brasil)	Gold	30,000^{‡}
Canada (Music Canada)	Platinum	80,000^{*}
Italy (FIMI)	Gold	15,000^{‡}
New Zealand (RMNZ)	Platinum	30,000^{‡}
United Kingdom (BPI)	Gold	400,000^{‡}
Streaming
Denmark (IFPI Danmark)	Gold	900,000^{†}
^{*} Sales figures based on certification alone.^{‡} Sales+streaming figures based on certification alone.^{†} Streaming-only figures based on certification alone.

== Release history ==
Release dates for "True Love"
Country	Date	Format	Label
Italy	June 28, 2013	Contemporary hit radio	Sony Music
United States	July 15, 2013	Hot AC radio	RCA Records
United Kingdom	July 22, 2013	Contemporary hit radio	RCA Records
United States	July 23, 2013	Contemporary hit radio	RCA Records
Germany	August 30, 2013	CD single	Sony Music
