= Churchill (band) =

American rock band

- Origin: Denver, Colorado, U.S.
- Genres: Alternative rock, folk rock
- Years active: 2009-2013
- Labels: A&M/Octone
- Members: Bethany Kelly (vox/piano); Tim Bruns (guitar/vox); Mike Morter (mandolin/guitar); Tyler Rima (bass); Joe Richmond (drums)
- Website: churchilltheband.com (now defunct)

Churchill was an American rock band from Denver. The band was founded as a two-piece by Tim Bruns and Mike Morter in 2008, but by 2009 had expanded to five members. The group self-released a self-titled EP in 2009 and a full-length titled Happy/Sad in 2011. They originally released their second EP, entitled Change in early 2012. The band signed with A&M/Octone Records later that year, after which they re-released Change. The EP reached #9 on the Billboard Heatseekers chart. The title track became a hit single, reaching #17 on the Alternative Songs chart and was an iTunes Free Song of the Week in early 2013. The band had planned to release their next full-length album in 2013.

Churchill served as the main supporting act during the European leg of Pink's The Truth About Love Tour.

On July 12, 2013, Churchill broke up and cancelled all upcoming appearances, according to a band representative. According to Mike Morter, "To protect all of us, we just say that we decided to go different ways. It ended after a great high".

== Discography ==
=== Studio albums ===
- Happy Sad (2011)

=== Extended plays ===
- Churchill EP (2009)
- Change EP (A&M/Octone Records, 2012)
- The War Within EP (A&M/Octone Records, 2013)
