= Sebastien Stella =

French choreographer and director (born 1971)

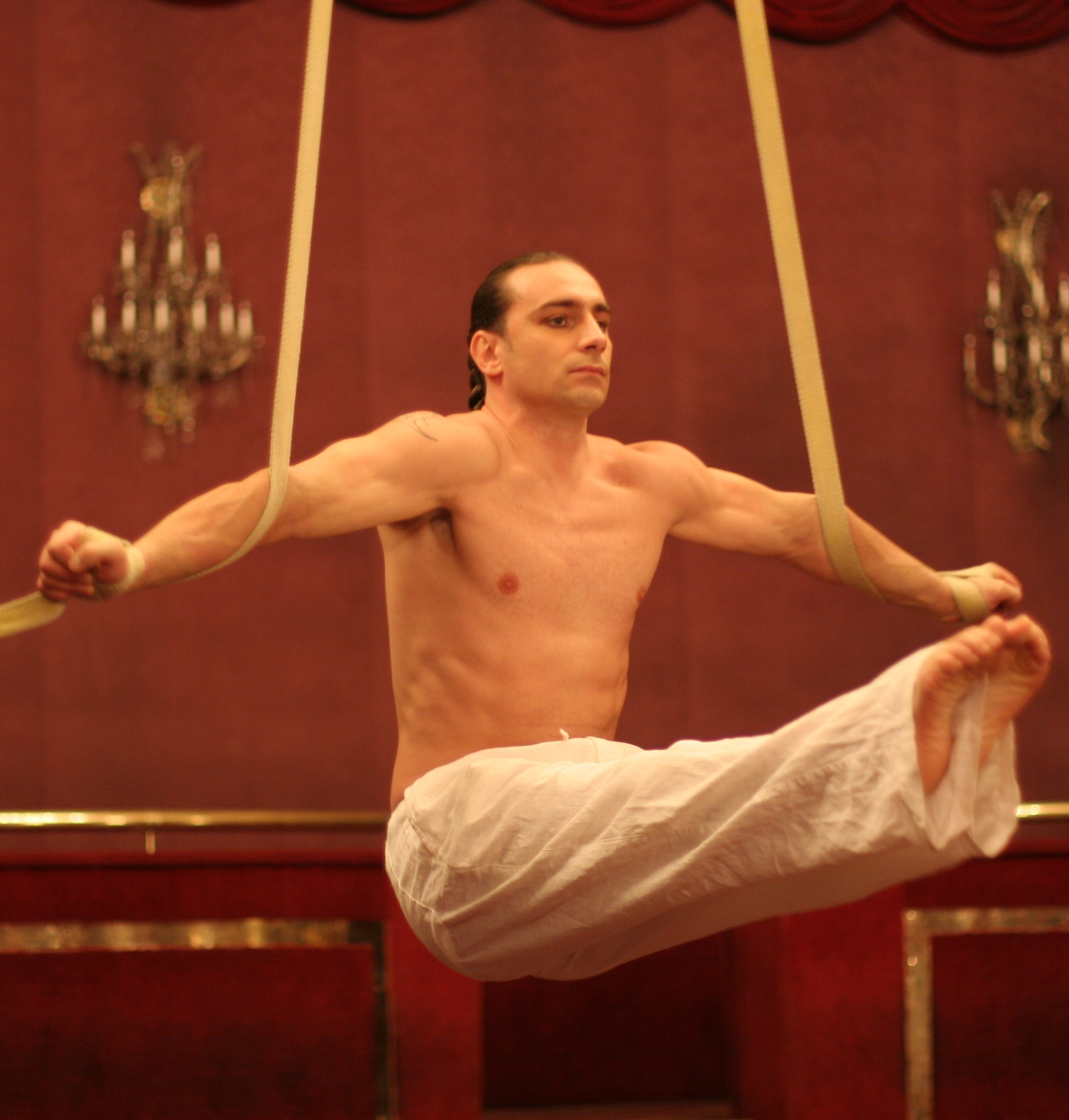
- Born: October 12, 1971 (age 54); Bourg-en-Bresse, France
- Other names: Seb
- Occupations: Choreographer, performer and actor
- Known for: Aerial performance routines for singer Pink, Circus choreography for the 2010 American romantic drama film Water for Elephants
- Website: tahitishowconcept.com/seb

Sebastien Stella (also known as Seb) (born October 12, 1971) is a French choreographer and director. He is best known for creating aerial performance routines for singer Pink and devising the circus choreography for the 2010 American romantic drama film Water for Elephants.

In 2011, Stella was ranked number three out of 50 most prominent French people in the United States by America’s largest French-language magazine France-Amerique.

== Early life ==
Stella was born on October 12, 1972, in Bourg en Bresse, France. He attended circus school and learned acrobatic movements. He graduated from the Club Med National Circus School in 1993. In 1997, Stella studied acting technique and improvisation at Studio Pygmalion in Paris. In 2008, he graduated from the Stella Adler Academy of Acting in Los Angeles. In 2011, he studied improvisation with the Upright Citizens Brigade Theatre in Los Angeles. From 1998 to 2000, he trained and performed with the Yamakasi, French founders of parkour, the "free-running" urban art. In 2010 he earned a black belt in traditional taekwondo (ITF). He has also learned Krav Maga, KAPAP, and muay Thai.

== Career ==
=== Army ===
In 1992, he served in the Brigade of Firefighters of Paris (BSPP), a French Army unit.

=== Choreography and acting ===
Stella achieved his initial success in 1998 as an original cast member of the international hit musical Notre-Dame de Paris. and a house troupe performer from 2002 to 2004 in the Cirque du Soleil production of "O" at the Bellagio resort and casino in Las Vegas, Nevada.

In 2008, Stella choreographed aerial stunts for Cher at the Colosseum, presented at Caesars Palace in Las Vegas, and appeared as Cher's circus partner in a video he created for the production featuring her as "Laverne." In the same year he created an aerial cradle and trained actress Stacey Dash for her performance on NBC's Celebrity Circus, and created most of the aerial acts for the show's first season as choreographer, coach and performance partner. He also devised, coordinated and participated in aerial stunts for Pink's successful 2009 Funhouse Tour. His inventions for Pink included a special cradle act she performed on the MTV Video Music Awards show in 2009. It featured her dangling from a trapeze, singing the song Sober upside down, with Stella as her trapeze partner.

Beside choreographing animals (circus choreography) and actors Reese Witherspoon and Christoph Waltz in the American romantic drama film Water for Elephants directed by Francis Lawrence, Stella appeared in the film along with his wife and longtime performing partner Katia Sereno. They played members of a circus family. He also did the circus choreography for the 2011 film Judy Moody and the Not Bummer Summer and created the carnival choreography for the 2013 film Oz the Great and Powerful directed by Sam Raimi.

In 2011, he worked as an acrobatic choreographer for the Britney Spears's Femme Fatale tour and in 2013 her music video "Work Bitch". In 2012, he again collaborated with Pink as stunt choreographer for her music video "Try" performed at the MTV Video Music Awards. He was stunt coordinator for Pink at the 2012 iHeartRadio Music Festival and American Music Awards. He was an aerial performer with Katy Perry in her premiere performance of "Wide Awake" on Billboard Music Awards show in 2012.

In 2014, Stella began his second season as a judge on popular French TV talent show, The Best, Le meilleur artiste and his first season on BBC One "Tumble". He has also worked in many TV commercials, devising stunts and physical effects for companies as TNT, Farmer's Insurance and Toyota.

== Recognition ==
- In 1993, he received a bronze National Defense Medal.
- In 2011, he was ranked number three out of 50 most prominent French people in the United States by America’s largest French-language magazine France-Amerique.
