= Are We All We Are =

Single by Pink

from the album The Truth About Love
- Released: October 31, 2013
- Recorded: 2012
- Studio: Earthstar Creation Center (Venice, California); Ruby Red Studios (Santa Monica, California); Sonora Recorders (Los Angeles, California)
- Genre: Pop
- Length: 3:37
- Label: RCA
- Songwriters: Alecia Moore; Butch Walker; John Hill; Emile Haynie
- Producers: Walker; Hill; Haynie

Pink singles chronology
"Walk of Shame" (2013)	"Are We All We Are" (2013)	"Today's the Day" (2015)

Music video
- "Are We All We Are" on YouTube

"Are We All We Are" is a song by American singer-songwriter Pink from her sixth studio album The Truth About Love (2012). It was released as the albums sixth and final single on October 31, 2013. The song was written by Pink, her long time collaborator Butch Walker, John Hill and Emile Haynie.

== Background ==
In late February, 2012, Pink released a statement on Twitter that she had begun work on her sixth studio album, and it would be released sometime that year. "Are We All We Are" was written in 2012 with her long time collaborator, Butch Walker. Pink stated that she thought "Are We All We Are" was the perfect tour opener, although performed in the middle of the set on her tour.

== Critical reception ==
Slant Magazine referred to it as "a crunchy call to arms with an infectious hook that turns the title into a wordless chant".

== Chart performance ==
"Are We All We Are" peaked at number 82 on the German Airplay Chart (GER) on the week of November 29, 2013.

== Music video ==
The official music video for the song was released on October 28, 2013, and it includes footage of her The Truth About Love Tour.

== Charts ==
Weekly chart performance
Chart (2013–2014)	Peak position
Belgium (Ultratip Bubbling Under Flanders)	3
Belgium (Ultratip Bubbling Under Wallonia)	6
Finland Airplay (Radiosoittolista)	13
France (SNEP)	143
Germany (GfK)	82
Hungary (Rádiós Top 40)	7

== Certifications ==
Certifications and sales
Region	Certification	Certified units/sales
Australia (ARIA)	Gold	35,000^{‡}
^{‡} Sales+streaming figures based on certification alone.
