= Walk of Shame (song) =

Single by Pink

from the album The Truth About Love
- Released: September 25, 2013
- Recorded: 2012
- Studio: Echo Studio (Los Angeles, California)
- Genre: Power pop
- Length: 2:44
- Label: RCA
- Songwriters: Alecia Moore; Greg Kurstin
- Producer: Greg Kurstin

Pink singles chronology
"True Love" (2013)	"Walk of Shame" (2013)	"Are We All We Are" (2013)

"Walk of Shame" is a song by American singer-songwriter Pink, taken from her sixth studio album The Truth About Love (2012). It was written by Pink and Greg Kurstin, and produced by the latter. It was released exclusively to Australian radio on September 25, 2013, as the fifth single from the album.

== Music video ==
An official lyric video for the song was uploaded to Pink's VEVO channel on September 14, 2012, in conjunction with the release of its parent album.

Released October 4, 2013, the official music video for "Walk of Shame" features tour footage from her Australian shows. It can only be viewed through the singer's YouTube and VEVO channels in Australia.

== Credits and personnel ==
Recording

- Mastered at Sterling Sound (New York City)

Management

- EMI Blockwood Music, Inc./P!nk Inside Music (BMI), Kurstin Music/EMI April Music, Inc. (ASCAP)

Personnel

- Pink – lead vocals, songwriter
- Greg Kurstin – songwriter, record producer, keyboards, guitar, bass, programming, engineering and mixing at Echo Studio, Los Angeles, CA
- Jesse Shatkin – additional engineering

Credits adapted from the liner notes of The Truth About Love (Deluxe Edition).

== Chart performance ==
"Walk of Shame" entered the ARIA Top 100 Singles chart at No. 100 for the week commencing October 7, 2013.

Chart (2013)	Peak
Australia (ARIA)	60

== Certifications ==
Region	Certification	Certified units/sales
Australia (ARIA)	Platinum	70,000^{‡}
^{‡} Sales+streaming figures based on certification alone.
