= Just Give Me a Reason =

2013 single by Pink featuring Nate Ruess

Single by Pink featuring Nate Ruess

from the album The Truth About Love
- Released: February 26, 2013
- Recorded: 2012
- Studio: Earthstar Creation Center (Venice, California)
- Genre: Pop
- Length: 4:02
- Label: RCA
- Songwriters: Pink; Jeff Bhasker; Nate Ruess
- Producer: Jeff Bhasker

Pink singles chronology
"Try" (2012)	"Just Give Me a Reason" (2013)	"True Love" (2013)

Nate Ruess singles chronology
"Only Love" (2012)	"Just Give Me a Reason" (2013)	"Headlights" (2014)

Music video
- "Just Give Me a Reason" on YouTube

"Just Give Me a Reason" is a song recorded by American singer Pink featuring Nate Ruess of the band Fun. The song was chosen as the third single from Pink's sixth studio album, The Truth About Love (2012). Written by Pink and Ruess alongside producer Jeff Bhasker, the song is a pop ballad about the desire to hold on to a relationship even when it appears to be breaking down.

The song received critical acclaim, with many critics deeming the song as the best track on the album. Prior to its release, the song charted in many regions due to strong digital sales, which was the reason for its release. The song attained worldwide success, topping the charts in twenty-one countries including the United States, Austria, Australia, Canada, the Czech Republic, Iceland, Ireland, Lebanon, Italy, Luxembourg, Mexico, Netherlands, New Zealand, Poland, Portugal, Slovakia, and Sweden, as well as peaking within the top five in more than ten countries as United Kingdom, Belgium, Brazil, Denmark, Finland, France, Israel, Norway, Switzerland, and Spain. In the US, it became Pink's fourth number-one single on the Billboard Hot 100. It also became her third number-one on the Billboard Digital Songs chart after "So What" (2008) and "Raise Your Glass" (2010). "Just Give Me a Reason" has sold more than 4 million digital downloads in the United States.

"Just Give Me a Reason" won the Billboard Mid-Year Award for Favorite Hot 100 No. Single, and garnered two Grammy Award nominations for Best Pop Duo/Group Performance and Song of the Year at the 2014 Grammy Awards, where Pink and Nate Ruess performed the song after a trapeze-accompanied rendition of "Try".

The music video for "Just Give Me a Reason" featured Nate Ruess as well as Pink's husband, off-road truck and former motocross racer Carey Hart, in a romantic setting which resembles an artificial marsh. The video won the MTV Video Music Award for Best Collaboration in 2013.

== Background ==
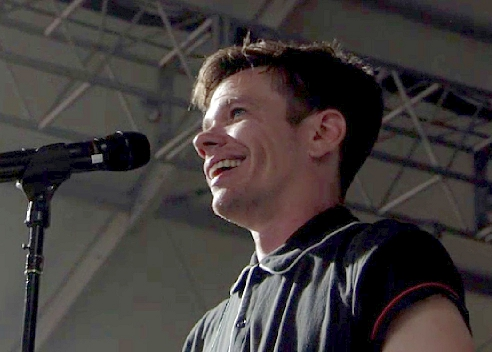
American singer-songwriter Nate Ruess co-wrote and provided vocals on "Just Give Me a Reason".

"Just Give Me a Reason" features Nate Ruess from the American band Fun. Originally, it was just a songwriting session but Pink realized that she needed someone else to sing the song with her because she thought that it was more of a conversation than a one-perspective song. She asked Ruess to sing the song with her as a duet.

Pink said "I was like, 'no, this is a story, this is a conversation this song' - it needs the other perspective whether it's a guy and a girl, or two girls or two guys. 'I came in and tried to convince him that this was how the conversation was going to go and it was interesting you know, he was like 'I'll just do the demo cos I don't know about duets' and I totally tricked him into doing it, and I am so glad I was able to. 'I think now he's very happy that he did it, I think it's a beautiful song and I'm really, really proud of it.

Nate Ruess told MTV News: "Writing the song was a whole different learning experience and was really fueled by the fact that Alecia [Pink's real name is Alecia Moore] is so strong and independent and so very much herself. At the end of the day it's so hard to argue against her because what she does is always so great.

The song is about the desire to hold on to a relationship even when it appears to be breaking down.

== Composition ==
"Just Give Me a Reason" (2013)
A 24-second sample of Pink's "Just Give Me a Reason", featuring Nate Ruess.

"Just Give Me a Reason" is a pop ballad written by both artists and produced by Jeff Bhasker, who was also the lead producer for Some Nights, the second album from Ruess' band, fun. "Just Give Me a Reason" starts off with a simple melody played on the piano, as Pink starts to sing the first stanza and chorus, the latter of which introduces drum machines and bass. The second stanza is then sung by Ruess, and the rest of the song is sung as a duet. The song ends with a piano solo, similar to the intro. It has a duration of four minutes and two seconds. Musicnotes.com published this song in the key of G major with a moderate tempo of 95 beats per minute. Pink and Ruess' vocals span two octaves in the song, from G_{3} to G_{5}. The verses of the song follow the chord progression G-C-Em-C-G, the chorus is G-D7/F#-Em-Bm-D7, while the pre-chorus, the intro, and the outro follow the progression of Em-A/C#-D repeated three times before C-G/B-Am, and with a variation into the second chorus.

== Critical reception ==
The song received acclaim from contemporary critics. Jody Rosen from Rolling Stone referred positively to "Just Give Me a Reason" as the best track within the album, "in which Pink dials back the drama, letting the melody and sentiments do their work". Sharing the same opinion, Amy Sciaretto from PopCrush said she liked the "soft" side of Pink and that she and Nate Ruess "fit like a jigsaw puzzle, a lovely yin and yang." Bill Lamb from About.com said: "The genius behind 'Just Give Me a Reason' is that it is a powerful, well written song that is allowed to shine by a simple, spare Jeff Bhasker production and straightforward vocals from Pink and Nate Ruess of the group Fun. The song lays out the emotions behind a wish for reconciliation in a relationship but doesn't provide easy answers. The simple piano based production ensures that every word is clear and the emotional tone of the voices is heard."

Lewis Corner from Digital Spy said: "As her latest single 'Just Give Me a Reason' demonstrates, Pink isn't afraid to band with pop's current flavour - and in this case it's Fun.'s Nate Ruess. "I let you see the parts of me/ That weren't all that pretty/ And with every touch you fixed them," Pink reveals over a folksy piano line, before she bursts into a heart-warbling chorus. The final result may echo fun.'s own anthemic hits, but Pink never fails to make a song her own, even when sharing the spotlight." MusicOMH said that "Pink's other side – the impassioned songwriter – is showcased on Try, which demonstrates that she has a voice that not enough people give her credit for. Similar territory is trodden in Just Give Me a Reason, a duet with fun.'s lead singer Nate Ruess (which sounds more like a fun. song than a Pink song, funnily enough), but it’s these moments that show Pink at her most formulaic."

Common Sense Media (CSM) said, "Pink, singer from band fun. team up in sweet love tune." Billboard also gave a positive review of the song saying this duet with the band's lead singer Nate Ruess (produced by "We Are Young" helmer Jeff Bhasker) would fit right at home on "Some Nights": "Although it's a little jarring to hear Pink's raw, live vocals paired with Ruess' Auto-Tune, it's ultimately a less-schmaltzy version of those male/female duets found at the end credits of every 80s movie." HitFix said One of the highlights is her duet with fun.'s Nate Ruess, who co-wrote "Just Give Me a Reason".

== Chart performance ==
In the United States, "Just Give Me a Reason" topped the iTunes chart on March 19, 2013, and remained atop the list for more than 10 consecutive days, becoming Pink's third Digital Songs number-one hit. In early April, it fell to the runner-up position to Bruno Mars's "When I Was Your Man" only to return to the top two days later and stayed there for the entire month of April 2013. Its success in the digital market was reflected on its Hot 100 position, making it Pink's fourteenth Top 10 hit in the USA during the charting week ending March 30, 2013, then pushing it further to the top to #5 and then to #3, and finally to the top of the chart. The song spent 15 weeks in the top 10. The Truth About Love is, therefore, Pink's first set to achieve more than two Top 10 hits since Missundaztood. On the issue dated April 27, 2013, it reached number one on the Billboard Hot 100, becoming Pink's fourth chart-topper and Nate Ruess' second overall, after "We Are Young" with his band Fun. It also was Pink's longest time spent as a lead artist at number one, as it ruled for three consecutive weeks. The song is the seventh best-selling song of 2013 with 4,321,000 download copies sold in the United States for the year.

As of January 2014, the song has sold a total of 4,405,000 downloads in the US. With "Just Give Me a Reason" soaring to number one on the Adult Top 40 chart, it became Pink's eighth number one song there and her tenth top ten overall. Pink currently ties the record for most number ones on that chart, with Katy Perry and Maroon 5 each having eight. "Just Give Me a Reason" also reached number one on both the US Pop Songs, Adult Pop Songs, Adult contemporary chart and Digital Songs.

In Mexico the song debuted at number one, it has been certified 3× Platinum, denoting sales of almost 180,000 copies in the country.

The song attained worldwide success, topping the charts in 20 countries including the United States, Austria, Czech Republic, Iceland, Ireland, Lebanon, Italy, Luxembourg, Mexico, Netherlands, New Zealand, Poland, Portugal, Scotland, Slovakia, Sweden, Australia, Canada as well as peaking within the top five in more than ten countries as United Kingdom, Belgium, Brazil, Denmark, Finland, France, Israel, Norway, Switzerland and Spain.

On the week of October 6, 2012, "Just Give Me a Reason" debuted at number 106 in the US and at number 75 in Canada. That was the same week that the second single of the album ("Try") debuted at number 56. "Just Give Me a Reason" has also debuted at 65 in Switzerland and 168 in France.

In the United Kingdom "Just Give Me a Reason" stayed in the Top 10 for 11 weeks. It has been certified 3× Platinum by the British Phonographic Industry, with sales of almost 800,000 copies in 2013 making it the eighth best-selling song of the year.

In Australia, the song debuted at number six on the week of February 17, 2013, before peaking at one the following week. This makes The Truth About Love Pink's first album to score two number-one singles in the country, the first single being "Blow Me (One Last Kiss)". This is also Nate Ruess's first number-one song but third overall since his band Fun had two songs that went number one. In the Netherlands, the song went to number one on February 23, 2013, marking it Pink's very first Dutch number-one song in her 13-year career.

In France, the single re-entered in February 2013 at number 144 and jumping from 67 spots to reach the number 78 the next week, becoming her biggest-jumping in French Singles Chart. Early March 2013, "Just Give Me A Reason" reached the top forty, at number 38, becoming P!nk's fifteenth top forty. End of this month, the song reached top ten, becoming third top ten for the singer, before jumping to top five, at number 4, becoming her third top five. The song spent three weeks at the fourth position, nine weeks at the top ten and 69 weeks in total and has sold a total of 119.000 downloads, becoming Pink's longuest running song in France. In Canada, the song went to number one on April 13, 2013, making Pink's second number-one single in the country after "So What". It has spent seven consecutive weeks at number one on the Canadian Hot 100, becoming her longest-reigning number-one single. It was the third best-selling song of 2013 in Canada with 499,000 copies sold.

According to the IFPI, by the end of the year, the single had sold 9.9 million copies. The song was the 4th best-selling song of 2013.

== Music video ==
=== Background and release ===
The video was directed by Diane Martel and photographed by Jeff Cronenweth. It was filmed in November 2012. Pictures from the video were posted on Twitter. In the pictures, Pink is lying in bed with her husband Carey Hart. Pink was extremely disappointed by the leak, so the photos were deleted immediately after. The official video was released on February 5, 2013. A behind the scenes video was later added to Pink's VEVO channel, where Pink confirms that the video was shot in a Los Angeles swimming pool.

The video won the MTV Video Music Award for Best Collaboration in 2013. The video was nominated for Video of the Year on the People's Choice Awards 2014. As of May 2026, it has received over 2 billion views on YouTube.

=== Synopsis ===
The video shows Pink lying on a mattress in the middle of an artificial marsh, with fog surrounding the set and a star-studded background. The video is highly symbolic and its storyline is indirect, with references supporting the song's theme, including a teddy bear, a TV floating on the surface of the water, the water itself and a wall made of wood in the background. The scenes include Pink's solo mattress scene, another with Nate Ruess shows the two singers singing the song in a white, blank set, and a third scene showing Pink and her husband Carey Hart embracing and diving.

=== Lyric video ===
An official lyric video was published on Pink's official VEVO account in September 2012. It features stars that sparkle in the background. The lyrics shown are sung by both Pink and Ruess.

== Credits and personnel ==
- Pink – songwriter, vocals
- Nate Ruess – songwriter, vocals
- Jeff Bhasker – songwriter, producer, keyboards, synthesizer and music programmer
- Anders Mouridsen – guitars
- John X. Volaitis – recording at Earthstar Creation Center, Venice, California
- Tony Maserati – mixer
- Justin Hergett – assistant mixer
- James Krausse – assistant mixer

Credits adapted from The Truth About Love album liner notes.

== Track listing ==
- Digital download
1. "Just Give Me a Reason" – 4:02
- German CD single
1. "Just Give Me a Reason" – 4:02
2. "Are We All We Are" (Live from Los Angeles) – 3:32

Year	Ceremony	Award	Result
2014
2014	56th Grammy Awards	Song of the Year	Nominated
2014	56th Grammy Awards	Best Pop Duo/Group Performance	Nominated
2014	MTV Video Music Awards	Best Collaboration	Won
2014	MTV Video Music Awards	Best Female Video	Nominated
2014	MTV Video Music Awards	Best Editing	Nominated
2014	Teen Choice Awards	Choice Love song	Nominated
2014	People's Choice Awards	Favorite Song	Nominated
2014	People's Choice Awards	Favorite Music Video	Nominated

== Charts ==
=== Weekly charts ===
2013–2014 weekly chart performance
Chart (2013–2014)	Peak position
Australia (ARIA)	1
Austria (Ö3 Austria Top 40)	1
Belgium (Ultratop 50 Flanders)	2
Belgium (Ultratop 50 Wallonia)	3
Canada Hot 100 (Billboard)	1
CIS Airplay (TopHit)	7
Croatia International Airplay (Top lista)	1
Czech Republic Airplay (ČNS IFPI)	1
Czech Republic Singles Digital (ČNS IFPI)	44
Denmark (Tracklisten)	3
Euro Digital Song Sales (Billboard)	1
Finland (Suomen virallinen lista)	4
France (SNEP)	4
Germany (GfK)	1
Hungary (Rádiós Top 40)	12
Iceland (RÚV)	7
Ireland (IRMA)	1
Israel International Airplay (Media Forest)	2
Italy (FIMI)	1
Lebanon Airplay (Lebanese Top 20)	1
Luxembourg Digital Songs (Billboard)	1
Mexico Airplay (Billboard)	7
Netherlands (Dutch Top 40)	1
Netherlands (Single Top 100)	1
New Zealand (Recorded Music NZ)	1
Norway (VG-lista)	2
Poland Airplay (ZPAV)	1
Portugal Digital Songs Sales (Billboard)	1
Romania Airplay (Media Forest)	1
Russia Airplay (TopHit)	7
Scottish Singles Sales (Official Charts)	1
Slovakia Airplay (ČNS IFPI)	1
Slovenia Airplay (SloTop50)	4
South Africa Airplay (EMA)	10
Spain (Promusicae)	5
Sweden (Sverigetopplistan)	1
Switzerland (Schweizer Hitparade)	2
UK Singles (Official Charts)	2
Ukraine Airplay (TopHit)	17
US Billboard Hot 100	1
US Adult Contemporary (Billboard)	1
US Adult Pop Airplay (Billboard)	1
US Pop Airplay (Billboard)	1
US Rhythmic Airplay (Billboard)	39

2025–2026 weekly chart performance
Chart (2025–2026)	Peak position
Austria (Ö3 Austria Top 40)	8
Czech Republic Singles Digital (ČNS IFPI)	32
Denmark (Tracklisten)	37
France (SNEP)	138
Germany (GfK)	23
Global 200 (Billboard)	27
Ireland (IRMA)	19
Lithuania (AGATA)	39
Lithuania Airplay (TopHit)	80
Luxembourg (Billboard)	18
Netherlands (Global Top 40)	10
Netherlands (Single Top 100)	25
Netherlands (Streaming Top 40)	14
Norway (VG-lista)	12
Portugal (AFP)	56
Romania Airplay (TopHit)	86
Slovakia Singles Digital (ČNS IFPI)	35
Sweden (Sverigetopplistan)	12
Switzerland (Schweizer Hitparade)	8
UK Singles (Official Charts)	15

=== Year-end charts ===
Year-end chart performance
Chart (2013)	Position
Australia (ARIA)	6
Austria (Ö3 Austria Top 40)	6
Belgium (Ultratop 50 Flanders)	15
Belgium (Ultratop 50 Wallonia)	18
Brazil (Crowley)	45
Canada (Canadian Hot 100)	3
Croatia International Airplay (HRT)	1
Denmark (Tracklisten)	7
France (SNEP)	16
Germany (Media Control AG)	12
Ireland (IRMA)	5
Israel International Airplay (Media Forest)	13
Italy (FIMI)	5
Moldova (Media Forest)	5
Netherlands (Dutch Top 40)	7
Netherlands (Mega Single Top 100)	4
New Zealand (Recorded Music NZ)	4
Philippines (Over-All Top 20)	1
Russia Airplay (TopHit)	38
Slovenia (SloTop50)	9
Spain (PROMUSICAE)	19
South Korea (Gaon International Chart)	183
Sweden (Sverigetopplistan)	13
Switzerland (Schweizer Hitparade)	8
Ukraine Airplay (TopHit)	32
UK Singles (Official Charts Company)	8
US Billboard Hot 100	7
US Adult Contemporary (Billboard)	2
US Adult Pop Songs (Billboard)	2
US Radio Songs (Billboard)	5
US Hot Ringtones	8
US Pop Songs (Billboard)	11
Worldwide (IFPI)	4

Year-end chart performance
Chart (2014)	Position
France (SNEP)	192
Slovenia (SloTop50)	47
US Adult Contemporary (Billboard)	22

=== Decade-end charts ===
Decade-end chart performance
Chart (2010–2019)	Position
Australia (ARIA)	59
Austria (Ö3 Austria Top 40)	99
Netherlands (Single Top 100)	99

=== All-time charts ===
All-time chart performance for "Just Give Me a Reason"
Chart	Position
Belgium (Ultratop 50 Flanders)	421
Belgium (Ultratop 50 Wallonia)	965
Dutch Love Songs (Dutch Top 40)	13
Switzerland (Schweizer Hitparade)	170
US Adult Top 40 (Billboard)	36

== Certifications ==
Region	Certification	Certified units/sales
Australia (ARIA)	13× Platinum	910,000^{‡}
Austria (IFPI Austria)	Platinum	30,000^{*}
Belgium (BRMA)	Platinum	30,000^{*}
Brazil (Pro-Música Brasil)	2× Diamond	500,000^{‡}
Canada (Music Canada)	Diamond	800,000^{‡}
Denmark (IFPI Danmark)	Platinum	30,000^{^}
Finland (Musiikkituottajat)	Gold	33,024
France (SNEP)	Gold	75,000^{*}
Germany (BVMI)	3× Gold	450,000^{^}
Italy (FIMI)	3× Platinum	90,000^{*}
Mexico (AMPROFON)	3× Platinum+Gold	210,000^{*}
New Zealand (RMNZ)	7× Platinum	210,000^{‡}
Portugal (AFP)	3× Platinum	75,000^{‡}
Spain (Promusicae)	2× Platinum	120,000^{‡}
Sweden (GLF)	3× Platinum	120,000^{‡}
Switzerland (IFPI Switzerland)	2× Platinum	60,000^{^}
United Kingdom (BPI)	4× Platinum	2,400,000^{‡}
United States (RIAA)	2× Platinum	4,405,000
Streaming
Denmark (IFPI Danmark)	3× Platinum	5,400,000^{†}
Spain (Promusicae)	Gold	4,000,000^{†}
^{*} Sales figures based on certification alone.^{^} Shipments figures based on certification alone.^{‡} Sales+streaming figures based on certification alone.^{†} Streaming-only figures based on certification alone.

== Release history ==
Country	Date	Format
United States	February 26, 2013	Mainstream radio
United States	February 26, 2013	Hot AC radio
Italy	March 15, 2013	Contemporary hit radio
Germany	April 12, 2013	CD single
United States	April 15, 2013	Adult Contemporary radio

== See also ==
- List of best-selling singles
- List of best-selling singles in the United States
- List of Dutch Top 40 number-one singles of 2013
- List of highest-certified singles in Australia
- List of Hot 100 number-one singles of 2013 (Canada)
- List of Hot 100 number-one singles of 2013 (U.S.)
- List of number-one singles of 2013 (Australia)
- List of number-one hits of 2013 (Germany)
- List of number-one hits of 2013 (Sweden)
- List of number-one hits of 2013 (Switzerland)
- List of Billboard Adult Contemporary number ones of 2013
