= Try (Pink song) =

2012 single by Pink

Single by Pink

from the album The Truth About Love
- B-side: "My Signature Move"
- Released: September 6, 2012
- Recorded: 2012
- Studio: Earthstar Creation Center (Venice, California); Echo Studios (Los Feliz, California)
- Genre: Pop rock
- Length: 4:07
- Label: RCA
- Songwriters: Michael Busbee; Ben West
- Producer: Greg Kurstin

Pink singles chronology
"Blow Me (One Last Kiss)" (2012)	"Try" (2012)	"Just Give Me a Reason" (2013)

Music video
- "Try" on YouTube

"Try" is a song recorded by American singer Pink, which she released as the second single from her sixth album, The Truth About Love (2012). The song was originally written and composed by Busbee and Ben West, who recorded it in 2010 under the moniker GoNorthToGoSouth. Pink's version of the song was produced by Greg Kurstin, who also produced four other songs on the album.

Pink's version of "Try" was both a commercial and critical success. It reached number one in Spain and Slovakia, as well as the top-10 in Australia, Austria, Canada, Germany, Italy, New Zealand, Poland and Switzerland. In the United Kingdom it became Pink's seventeenth top-ten song on the Official Singles Chart while in the United States it peaked at number 9 on the Billboard Hot 100, marking her thirteenth top-ten on the chart.

The Floria Sigismondi-directed video features shots of a paint-covered Pink and her male love interest, expressing their frustrations through contemporary dance.

== Background and release ==
In February 2012 Pink confirmed she was writing lyrics and composing music for her then-untitled sixth album. An early version of the album's lead single, a song called "Blow Me (One Last Kiss)," was leaked online on July 1, 2012, resulting in the single being released a week earlier than planned. Rachel Raczka from The Boston Globe noted that "Try," the second single from The Truth About Love, also leaked in September 2012.

The songwriters originally thought about giving the song to Kelly Clarkson, then Daughtry; Adam Lambert recorded it, but according to Busbee, he "just wasn't the right fit." The song was then eventually pitched to Pink. Pink's version of the song premiered on radio on September 6, 2012. "Try" was amongst five lyrics videos that Pink uploaded on September 12, along with album tracks "Slut Like You," "Just Give Me a Reason" featuring Nate Ruess from fun., "How Come You're Not Here," and "Are We All We Are."

== Composition ==
"Try"
A sample of "Try"

"Try" was written and composed by Ben West and Busbee, while production was handled by Greg Kurstin, who also produced her previous single, "Blow Me (One Last Kiss)." It is a pop ballad modelled on 1980s FM Rock, built around two-volume arrangement, whereby the verses are quiet and the chorus is loud, according to Idolator's Carl Willot. Lyrically, it is an ode to taking risks with love, no matter the consequences. It also talks about hanging onto one's dreams and aspirations, even if it means taking risks. "Where there is desire there is gonna be a flame," sings Pink on the chorus. "Where there is a flame, someone's bound to get burned. But just because it burns, doesn't mean you're gonna die. You gotta get up and try, try, try." The song is in the key of D major with a moderately fast tempo of 104 beats per minute. "Try" follows a chord progression of G major-D major-A major-B minor, and Pink's vocals span two octave and a major third from D_{3} to F#_{5} (harmony).

== Critical reception ==
The song received mostly positive reviews from music critics, who praised its production. Andrew Hampp of Billboard commented "With a melody reminiscent of 'Whataya Want from Me,' the 2009 hit she penned for Adam Lambert, the single already pairs well sonically with Pink's catalog." Josh Langhoff of PopMatters called it "an ode to romantic persistence over crisp 'Hysteria' guitars." Amy Sciarretto of Pop Crush wrote, "It's a belter with a soulful voice, and she sounds like Kelly Clarkson with this song. The midtempo track finds Pink mourning, lamenting and musing on a relationship that is breaking down at its core. It hurts, but this song is a salve over the wound."

Dean Piper of Mirror Online wrote: "The stand out track and an obvious international radio hit is 'Try.' Think how big and fabulous 'Who Knew' was – 'Try' is on the same wavelength." Sarah Rodman of The Boston Globe called it a "keeper and an urging-to-victory battle cry," Robert Copsey of Digital Spy described it as "a ballad of the stadium-filling, lighter-waving variety." while Caryn Ganz of Spin called it a "breakup salve." Lewis Corner of Digital Spy gave the song 4 out of possible 5, writing: "Although she may not be treading new ground sonically, her passionate tones and solid determination will continue her chart presence – and rightly so." However, Sal Cinquemani of Slant Magazine was less positive, writing that "the midtempo 'Try' doesn't push Pink forward either, and it's marred by singsong lyrics." Greg Kot of Chicago Tribune also shared the same thought, writing: "No one, not even Pink, can save lyrics such as these."

== Commercial performance ==
=== North America ===
"Try" debuted after the album's release at number 56 on the Billboard Hot 100, on the week ending October 6, 2012. The song also debuted on the Adult Pop Songs chart, at number 29. Following Pink's highly-praised 2012 American Music Awards performance, "Try" rose from number 50 to number 18 on the Hot 100. The song peaked at number nine in its 15th week, becoming the album's second top-ten and Pink 13th top-ten on her career. It also marked the second time in her career to score a streak of four consecutive top-ten placements, following "Raise Your Glass" (2010), "Fuckin' Perfect" (2011), and "Blow Me (One Last Kiss)" (2012). The song has sold over 2 million copies in the US as of July 2013.

In Canada, the song debuted at number 26, on the Canadian Hot 100 chart issue date October 6, 2012. A week later, the song dropped to number 86, becoming the "Biggest Free Faller" of that week. After staying out for a week, the song re-entered at number 60 on the chart issue dated October 27, 2012. On the chart issue dated November 10, 2012, the song rose to number 25, becoming the "Greatest Gainer" of the week. On the week of November 10, 2012, it rose to number 18 remaining there for two weeks but rising again on the week of December 1, 2012 to number 12 becoming the greatest gainer once again.

=== Other territories ===
In the United Kingdom, "Try" debuted at number 163 on the UK Singles Chart on September 16, 2012, due to digital downloads after album's release. On November 11, 2012, "Try" reached number 40, and went on to peak at number eight on December 9, 2012, becoming 8, becoming Pink seventeenth top-ten song on the chart. As of 2023 "Try" is her seventeenth best selling song in the UK.

The song debuted at number five in Germany. After her performance on the TV program Wetten, dass..? in Freiburg, the song reached number two on the charts, blocked by Diamonds by Barbadian singer Rihanna. In France, "Try" charted low, debuting at number 87 on the charts by the end of September 2012, before falling to number 173. After two weeks, the single re-entered at number 81 in mid-October, before climbing to number 24 early December. On January 26, 2013, the song managed to peak at number 15, becoming P!nk's sixth top twenty in France. "Try" spent 56 weeks at the French Singles Chart.

The song reached equally the second spot at the Swiss Singles Chart, becoming P!nk's seventh top five. It spent 52 weeks, so one entire year. In Australia, "Try" debuted at number eight, on the ARIA Singles Chart. A few weeks later, it jumped up to number six, where it remained for two consecutive weeks. It became her 20th top-ten single in Australia. In New Zealand, "Try" debuted at number 21 on the New Zealand Singles Chart and so far has peaked at number seven, for two consecutive weeks a higher peak than her previous single, "Blow Me (One Last Kiss)," which peaked at number eight.

Surprisingly, "Try" re-entered the Italian Chart ("FIMI") at number 88 in Week 25 (from 16-06-2014 to 22-06-2014), and reached number 10 the following week. On Week 28, the song peaked at number 5.

== Music video ==
=== Background ===
The video was filmed in August. Pink stated that the video is one of the most beautiful music videos of her career. It was released on October 10, 2012. It was directed by Floria Sigismondi and choreographed by the Golden Boyz (who have worked with the likes of Madonna and Britney Spears) and stunt choreographer, Sebastien Stella. It was inspired by the Apache dance, a highly-stylized Parisian street performance. "Making this video was the most fun I've ever had in my entire career," said Pink. "I never wanted it to end. It's my favorite video ever."

Pink took to her Twitter page to record her mother, Judith's, reaction after showing her the risqué dance moves on the clip. "My mom, after seeing the new video... 'Wow, honey. I'm speechless. And uncomfortable. No one can ever say you play it safe.'" Pink's love interest is played by Broadway dancer Colt Prattes.

A reenactment of the video was performed during the 2012 American Music Awards where Pink received a standing ovation and was praised by critics for her ever-growing artistry. Billboard ranked "Try" the second best performance of the night, with the first being "Gangnam Style".

=== Synopsis ===
The video intersperses scenes from two locations: a sparsely furnished house where Pink performs a dramatic dance routine with Prattes, and a desert setting where they collide into one another. The video features flashes of color and is heavily metaphorical, portraying an unhealthy, tormented relationship through artistic usage of the two performers' bodies.

=== Reception ===
James Montgomery of MTV News praised the video, writing of it: "Despite the weighty subject matter, the clip also manages to be as restrained as the sinewy bodies it showcases. In a lot of ways, it reminds you of Sigur Ros' arty 'Fjögur píanó' piece — you know, the one with the naked Shia LaBeouf — only minus the erudite sense of self importance. This is, first and foremost, a pop video, only it aspires to be so much more. And in that regard, it is the kind of video that only Pink would make. She is certainly a huge star, and yet, she delights in continually pushing past the restraints of the pop genre. 'Try' certainly works as a video, and yet, one could also see it being performed on the stage, accompanied by an orchestra. It is big, it is beautiful, it is definitely a work of art, and it is uniquely, unquestionably Pink. She pushes herself — and, really, the entire concept of what a pop video can be — to the limit, and pulls it off with effortless grace. Your move, everyone else."

Sam Lansky of Idolator wrote: "Although Pink's videos are often driven by self-consciousness and irony, she plays it totally straight in this one, giving an emotive performance that communicates volumes, all while executing impressively acrobatic dance moves." Jason Lipshut of Billboard pointed out that watching Pink and Prattes "engage in heart-wringing physical movements" makes it "easy to see why the pop star so thoroughly enjoyed the shoot." Katie Hasty of HitFix felt the video allowed Pink to show off "her showmanship and physical abilities," adding, "It's very powerful, particularly since both performers hold their own in the give-and-take of command…Plus the styling is rad."

== Live performances ==
Pink performed Try for the first time live on The X Factor Australia on October 2, 2012. A reenactment of the video was performed during the 2012 American Music Awards where Pink received a standing ovation and received overwhelming praise from critics and celebrities for her ever-growing artistry. Entertainment Weekly wrote: "As usual, Pink took the night to new heights," giving the performance an A. Idolator ranked it as the best performance of the night saying: "It was the evening's only moment that fans will still be discussing years from now." The Los Angeles Times stated that Pink stole the show. Examiner described the performance as "powerful" and "flawless." ABC News praised Pink for singing live throughout the strenuous choreography & said the performance was "arresting." Yahoo said that the performance was "extraordinary" and suggested that this performance rivaled Pink's "Glitter in the Air" performance at the 52nd Annual Grammy Awards Philadelphia Weekly wrote: "P!nk wowed the crowd and national audience with the most stunningly artistic and challenging performance of the night." Following her performance, CNN wrote an article calling her "a true pop artist," further stating: "While Christina Aguilera has a tendency to oversing, Britney Spears can't sing, and Lauryn Hill sorta stopped singing, Pink has managed to carve a brilliant 13-year-career by being something that is incredibly rare these days -- an artist. A complete artist." Billboard ranked the performance 2nd best of the night behind Psy's Gangnam Style, labeling Pink as "the quintessential entertainer."

Following the performance, many celebrities took to their Twitter accounts to appreciate Pink. Nicole Scherzinger said: "Pink rules AMA's (sic).Thinking outside of the box n having the balls and talent to do it! Brilliant n beautiful performance!" Carly Rae Jepsen tweeted: "Pink Your performance was amazing!" Jenny McCarthy said: "As usual... @Pink was best live performance. That's talent." Hillary Scott of Lady Antebellum wrote: "I wish everyone could've seen the Pink performance in person....truly inspired and BLOWN AWAY!!!" Billy Mann wrote: "No offense but...tonight's show could've been listed as: "@PINK (w special guest, the #AMAs)." Claude Kelly exclaimed: "listen....THAT. IS. HOW. IT. IS. DONE. @Pink just made your eyes and ears her bitch. (sic)" Editor of Billboard Bill Werde wrote: "Creativity, daring, skill & a voice: is there really any argument that theres a more consistently compelling live pop act than Pink?" Harry Styles of One Direction said: "Just got shown Pink 's AMA performance...incredible." Members of The Wanted stated: "Pink was unbelievable, she gave the performance of the night. She's so incredible and such an amazing professional." Brandy described the performance as "unforgettable."

On December 8, 2012 Pink performed the song on Wetten, dass..? ("Wanna bet that..?") in Germany and recreated the music video on stage.

On January 26, 2014 Pink performed "Try" at the 56th Annual Grammy Awards.

After receiving the award for Outstanding Contribution to Music at the 2019 Brit Awards (February 20, 2019), Pink performed "Try". The song was performed in a medley along with her newest single "Walk Me Home", "Just like Fire", "Just Give Me a Reason" (featuring Bastille singer Dan Smith) and concluding with "What About Us". During "Try" Pink was joined by a dancer with rain pouring down on the stage.

== Track listing ==
CD single / digital download

1. "Try" – 4:07
2. "My Signature Move" – 3:44

== Credits and personnel ==
"Try"

- Busbee – songwriter
- Kevin Dukes – guitar
- Greg Kurstin – engineer, keyboards, bass guitar, programming, mixing, producer
- Jesse Shatkin – additional engineering
- Ben West – songwriter

"My Signature Move"

- Pink (Alecia Moore) – lead vocals and background vocals, songwriter
- Jake Sinclair – background vocals, engineer, mixing, music, songwriter
- Butch Walker – background vocals, music, producer, songwriter

As adapted from CD single liner credits.

== Famous cover versions ==
On September 24, 2013, Tessanne Chin covered the song on Season 5 of NBC's singing competition, The Voice for her blind audition. After all four coaches (Adam Levine, Cee Lo Green, Christina Aguilera and Blake Shelton) wanted to mentor her, she chose Levine. She later covered the song again for one of her three Finale performances.

== Charts ==
=== Weekly charts ===
Weekly chart performance for "Try"
Chart (2012–2014)	Peak position
Australia (ARIA)	6
Austria (Ö3 Austria Top 40)	3
Belgium (Ultratop 50 Flanders)	16
Belgium (Ultratop 50 Wallonia)	10
Canada Hot 100 (Billboard)	4
CIS Airplay (TopHit)	4
Czech Republic Airplay (ČNS IFPI)	2
Denmark (Tracklisten)	15
Finland (Suomen virallinen lista)	13
France (SNEP)	15
Germany (GfK)	2
Hungary (Rádiós Top 40)	2
Hungary (Single Top 40)	4
Ireland (IRMA)	12
Italy (FIMI)	2
Lebanon (Lebanese Top 20)	10
Luxembourg Digital Songs (Billboard)	5
Mexico (Billboard Ingles Airplay)	2
Mexico Anglo (Monitor Latino)	4
Netherlands (Dutch Top 40)	23
Netherlands (Single Top 100)	19
New Zealand (Recorded Music NZ)	7
Norway (VG-lista)	12
Poland (Video Chart)	3
Portugal Digital Song Sales (Billboard)	8
Romania (Airplay 100)	7
Russia Airplay (TopHit)	9
Scottish Singles Sales (Official Charts)	5
Slovakia Airplay (ČNS IFPI)	1
Slovenia (SloTop50)	20
South Africa (Mediaguide)	2
South Korea International Singles (Gaon)	136
Spain (Promusicae)	1
Sweden (Sverigetopplistan)	47
Switzerland (Schweizer Hitparade)	2
UK Singles (Official Charts)	8
Ukraine Airplay (TopHit)	8
US Billboard Hot 100	9
US Adult Contemporary (Billboard)	1
US Adult Pop Airplay (Billboard)	1
US Dance Club Songs (Billboard)	21
US Pop Airplay (Billboard)	6

=== Year-end charts ===
2012 year-end chart performance for "Try"
Chart (2012)	Position
Australia (ARIA)	51
Austria (Ö3 Austria Top 40)	72
France (SNEP)	157
Germany (Media Control AG)	70
Hungary (Rádiós Top 40)	64
Italy (FIMI)	39
Russia Airplay (TopHit)	121
Switzerland (Schweizer Hitparade)	55

2013 year-end chart performance for "Try"
Chart (2013)	Position
Austria (Ö3 Austria Top 40)	66
Belgium (Ultratop Flanders)	81
Belgium (Ultratop Wallonia)	49
Canada (Canadian Hot 100)	21
France (SNEP)	57
Germany (Media Control AG)	60
Hungary (Rádiós Top 40)	60
Italy (FIMI)	14
Moldova (Media Forest)	18
Netherlands (Dutch Top 40)	112
Netherlands (Single Top 100)	76
Russia Airplay (TopHit)	54
Spain (PROMUSICAE)	12
Switzerland (Schweizer Hitparade)	30
Ukraine Airplay (TopHit)	65
US Billboard Hot 100	53
US Adult Contemporary (Billboard)	7
US Adult Pop Songs (Billboard)	7
US Pop Airplay (Billboard)	36
US Radio songs (Billboard)	29

2014 year-end chart performance for "Try"
Chart (2014)	Position
Italy (FIMI)	98

== Certifications ==
Certifications and sales for "Try"
Region	Certification	Certified units/sales
Australia (ARIA)	7× Platinum	490,000^{‡}
Austria (IFPI Austria)	Gold	15,000^{*}
Belgium (BRMA)	Gold	15,000^{*}
Brazil (Pro-Música Brasil)	Diamond	250,000^{‡}
Canada (Music Canada)	6× Platinum	480,000^{‡}
Denmark (IFPI Danmark)	Gold	15,000^{^}
Finland (Musiikkituottajat)	Gold	19,433
Germany (BVMI)	Platinum	300,000^{^}
Italy (FIMI)	4× Platinum	120,000^{‡}
Mexico (AMPROFON)	Diamond+2× Platinum	420,000^{‡}
New Zealand (RMNZ)	4× Platinum	120,000^{‡}
Portugal (AFP)	Gold	10,000^{‡}
Spain (Promusicae)	Platinum	60,000^{‡}
Sweden (GLF)	Platinum	40,000^{‡}
Switzerland (IFPI Switzerland)	2× Platinum	60,000^{^}
United Kingdom (BPI)	2× Platinum	1,200,000^{‡}
United States	—	2,000,000
Streaming
Denmark (IFPI Danmark)	Platinum	1,800,000^{†}
^{*} Sales figures based on certification alone.^{^} Shipments figures based on certification alone.^{‡} Sales+streaming figures based on certification alone.^{†} Streaming-only figures based on certification alone.

== Release history ==
Release dates for "Try"
Country	Date	Format	Label
Italy	October 19, 2012	Contemporary hit radio	Sony Music
United States	October 29, 2012	Hot AC radio	RCA Records
United States	October 29, 2012	Contemporary hit radio	RCA Records
Germany	November 16, 2012	CD single	Sony Music
United Kingdom	November 16, 2012	Digital download	RCA Records
