= Beautiful Trauma World Tour =

2018–19 concert tour by Pink

- World tour by Pink
- Promotional poster for 2018 concerts
- Location: Europe; North America; Oceania; South America
- Associated albums: Beautiful Trauma; Hurts 2B Human
- Start date: March 1, 2018
- End date: November 2, 2019
- No. of shows: 159
- Supporting acts: Bang Bang Romeo; Bleachers; Vance Joy; KidCutUp; Julia Michaels; Davina Michelle; The Rubens
- Attendance: 3,088,647
- Box office: $397.3 million

Pink concert chronology
- The Truth About Love Tour (2013–2014); Beautiful Trauma World Tour (2018–2019); Summer Carnival (2023–2024)

The Beautiful Trauma World Tour was the seventh concert tour by American singer Pink, in support of her seventh studio album, Beautiful Trauma (2017) and her eighth studio album Hurts 2B Human (2019) for the 2019 shows. The tour began in Phoenix, Arizona, on March 1, 2018, at the Talking Stick Resort Arena, and concluded on November 2, 2019, in Austin, Texas, at the Circuit of the Americas.

By its conclusion, the Beautiful Trauma World Tour became the seventh-highest-grossing tour by a female artist and the highest-grossing tour of the 2010s, earning $397.3 million and selling over 3 million tickets.

== Development ==
A second promotional poster for the tour was used to promote the 2019 shows in North America, Europe, and South America.

After the end of the successful The Truth About Love Tour (which was the third best-selling tour of 2013 with $147.9 million in ticket revenue) and the release of the album rose ave. with Canadian singer-songwriter Dallas Green under the name You+Me, Pink took a break. However, during this time, she released some songs, including "Today's the Day" on September 10, 2015, used as a theme song for season 13 of The Ellen DeGeneres Show and "Just like Fire" on April 15, 2016, for the soundtrack to the 2016 film Alice Through the Looking Glass.

On August 10, 2017, the lead single "What About Us" was released. On October 4, 2017, Pink announced she would release an Apple Music documentary about the recording of her anticipated seventh studio album Beautiful Trauma, later released on October 13. The following day, she announced the tour, revealing tour dates in North America. Originally, the singer has planned to play 40 shows, but due to high demand, second dates in Chicago, Toronto, New York City, Boston, Washington, D.C., Houston, Dallas and Oakland were later added. On October 9, 2017, she announced 17 dates in Australia and New Zealand. However, due to overwhelming demand, new shows were added, bringing the total number to 42 shows in Oceania.

On May 3, 2018, after incredible success and demand, Pink announced a second North American leg starting in 2019, including rescheduled shows for Detroit and Montreal, following previous postponements, due to illness.

On October 16, 2018, Pink revealed the European dates, which were scheduled between June and August 2019. These shows took place in stadiums instead of arenas like the previous dates on this tour. Second dates were added in Cologne, Munich and Glasgow, due to high demand; additional dates in Oslo, Horsens, Gelsenkirchen and The Hague were later announced. She announced a show in Rio de Janeiro, as part of 2019 Rock in Rio festival; this concert marked her first performance in South America.

On April 18, 2019, Pink announced a performance at the 2019 Formula One United States Grand Prix Concert Series in Austin. She later announced that she had to reschedule her May 2019 Toronto shows due to illness. The new dates took place in August after the European leg of the tour. Along with the rescheduled dates, Pink announced a concert in Uniondale, New York at the Nassau Veterans Memorial Coliseum.

== Critical response ==
=== North America ===
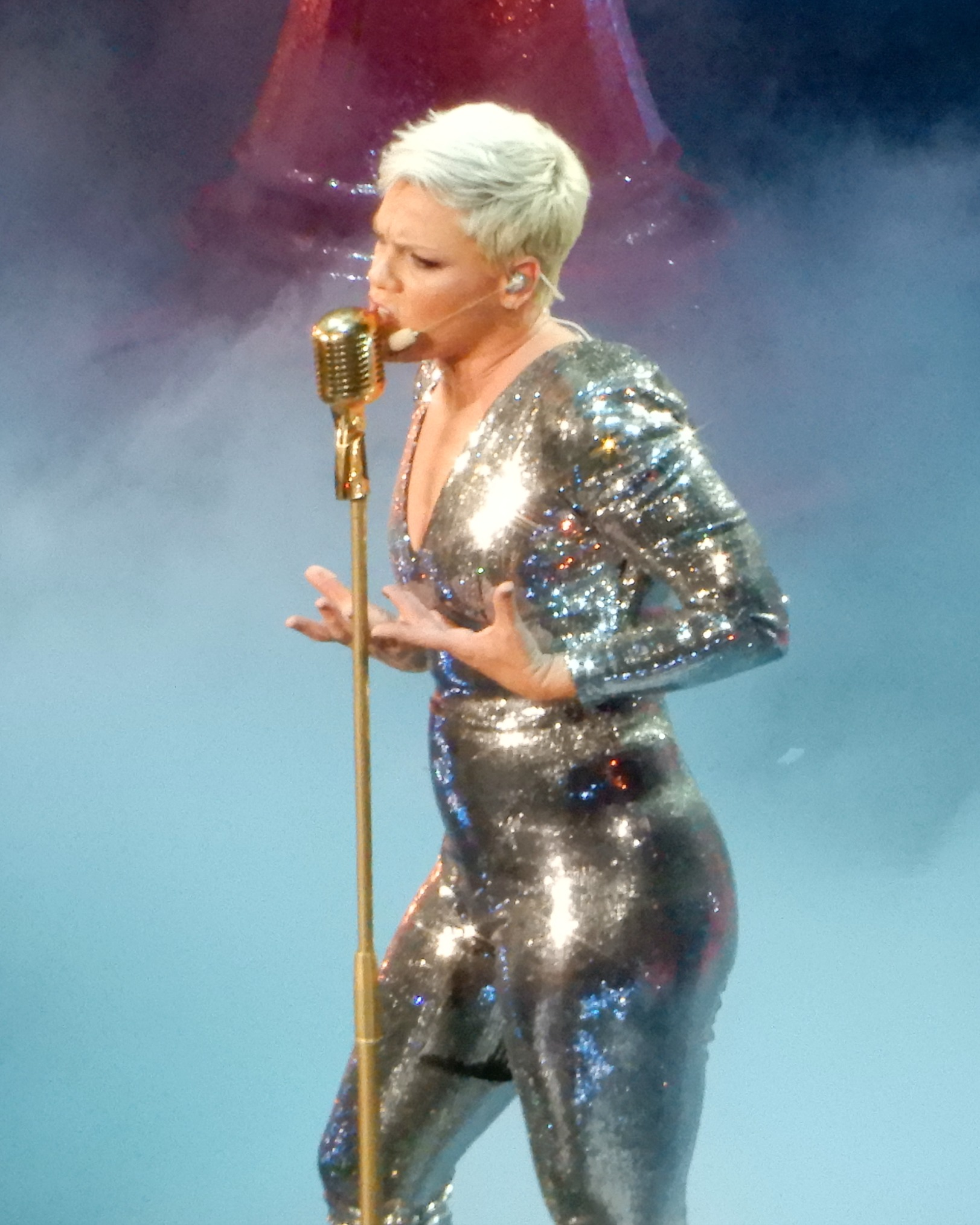
Pink performing "Beautiful Trauma" at Madison Square Garden

Ed Masley from The Arizona Republic, who was at the first show of the tour which took place in Phoenix, wrote that "the whole thing was brilliantly staged, with bright colors, interpretive dancing and plenty of high-flying spectacle. If for some reason, you believe you've seen another artist put more time and effort into doing acrobatics high above the crowd, you may just be thinking of Cirque du Soleil." Jimmie Tramel of Tulsa World reviewed positively the concert on March 5, 2018, in Tulsa. He said "Wow. That's really the only word necessary to describe Pink's concert Monday night at the BOK Center." Omaha World-Herald staff writer Kevin Coffey attended and reviewed the concert in Lincoln, stating that Pink has "set the bar very, very high" and that "her contemporaries should buy a ticket, sit in the back and take notes. That's how it should be done." Also L. Kent Wolgamott attended the same show and wrote another positive review for Journal Star, saying that "More than years ago, she delivered the best show in the first year of Pinnacle Bank Arena. On Tuesday night, she did it again with another singing/dancing/flying spectacle that [...] not only sets the bar for concerts, it is the bar." He also praised Pink's stage presence: "When she wasn't flying around, Pink was in constant motion on the stage, joining her 10 dancers in tightly choreographed routines, slapping hands with audience members and basking in the spotlights." Kirstine Walton of National Rock Review reviewed the first show in Chicago, stating that "Each time you see P!nk you wonder what new elements she can bring to the performance, but each time she raises the bar yet again. Not only does she make the entire performance appear to be effortless, she truly looks like she is having the time of her life on the stage." She also noticed the connection between Pink and her tour crew, adding that "the respect and camaraderie for her band and dancers is clearly evident throughout, taking the time to name everyone individually, providing each of them their moment in the spotlight in turn."

The second show at Madison Square Garden in New York City was reviewed positively by Bobby Olivier of NJ.com, who defined the Beautiful Trauma World tour "the tour to beat in 2018". He also wrote that Pink is "a terrific live vocalist with a list of radio hits so long that she cannot fit them all into a single set while still giving space to songs from a new album." After the show in Boston on April 9, Marc Hirsh from Boston Globe, about Pink's performances, stated that "None of this is new, of course. But the fact remains that no other pop star is even attempting this sort of thing, so to watch Pink do it and keep singing remains as astonishing as when she first added literal acrobatics without a harness or net to her arsenal years ago." The concert in Atlanta was reviewed positively by Melissa Ruggieri from The Atlanta Journal-Constitution, who defined it "nearly two hours of unabashed fun." She also praised Pink as a person as well as an entertainer: "The fact that Pink does it all with a sly smile and potent, husky vocals is a tribute to her stamina, dedication and obvious joy at being onstage. She's also a down-to-earth presence to her fans, spending plenty of time laying on the catwalk floor to take selfies, acknowledging signs and accepting a gift for her 16-month-old son, Jameson [...] Pink has all the right moves. She's genuine, she's entertaining, she's a fantastic singer. And she's already the front-runner for the best concert of 2018."

Matthew Keever wrote a positive review for Houston Press about the show which took place on April 27, stating that "For nearly two hours, P!NK entertained a throng of enthusiastic fans with her soaring vocals, catchy choruses and high-flying acrobatics." Another positive review was written by Jim Harrington from Mercury News, who attended the show in Oakland. He said that "the pop superstar basically hits the crowd with everything she's got, and then some, for roughly two hours. There's pyrotechnics, aerial stunts, dance routines, hit songs, catchy banter and, yes, one giant, inflatable Eminem." He also added that Pink is "[...] all about exceeding expectations, pleasing the fans and delivering an equally encompassing and entertaining concert experience. And she definitely achieves her mission with her latest road show." Mikael Wood, regarding the show that took place in Anaheim, wrote a positive review for Los Angeles Times. In particular, he praised Pink's choice about the setlist: "yet for all Pink's razzle-dazzle — and let me be clear in saying that this new aerial stunt was truly astounding — the primary effect of Friday's production wasn't practical or technological but emotional. You left the gig feeling as if you had been spoken to from the heart, which in a room as big as this one might be the more impressive feat. [...] her hit singles from the last two decades put across an idea of timelessness; she's still taking a broadly universal approach."

=== Oceania ===
The first show in Oceania was reviewed positively by Ross McRae, who defined Pink's tour "her best yet", due to "the perfect mix of choreography, visuals, aerial acrobatics, pyrotechnics, novelty, sass and yes, that soaring voice that rises above any notion that she is just a robot on autopilot." Aziz Al-Sa'afin from Newshub attended one of the shows in Sydney and ended his review stating that "when it was over, I wanted more. I could have happily sat through another two hours of what I had just experienced." He also wrote that "P!nk is not just a singer-song writer – she's also a dancer, trapeze artist and comedian." The first show in Brisbane was reviewed by Daniel Johnson of Courier-Mail, who stated that "with an eight-piece backing band and ten dancers, and several set changes, the Beautiful Trauma tour is a musical, visual and theatrical extravaganza that redefines what can be done with an arena pop show." Another positive review was made by Bridget Jones for Stuff.co.nz: "up, down, front, back, left and right, Pink was everywhere, doing everything. Every move, every comment, and every song her fans wanted to hear – she performed about 20 of them throughout the spectacular performance – she took the audience on a wee journey from her early days as the bad girl of pop [...] through to her more recent hits." In addition, Pink's charisma was defined "unmatched".

=== Europe ===
Lisa O'Donnell wrote a positive review for Extra for the show in Dublin, who called "The spectacle is over-the-top in every possible way — circus aerial stunts and glitter explosions feature throughout the two-hour show." Sophie Williams from The Guardian rated the Cardiff show five out of five stars, stating "Pink condenses a tour's worth of energy, showmanship and stage production into one show, flexing her athleticism while singing live, on-key and with sublime verve." Elle May Rice from Liverpool Echo reviewed for Liverpool saying "Pink definitely has it all, balancing – literally – her incredible vocals, frequent costume changes, and daring acrobatics routines seamlessly...She made the whole crowd feel like family, bringing us together in a perfect, Pink way."

== Commercial performance ==
The first official boxscore from the tour was published on March 14, 2018, denoting superior numbers to The Truth About Love Tour. The show in Wichita at Intrust Bank Arena grossed $1,647,788 with 11,894 attendees, numbers superior to any single concert revenue of her previous tours in the country. The first leg of the North American part of the tour grossed $95,657,338 with an attendance of 691,247 over the first 46 dates of the tour.

Pink was the top earning artist for March 2019, grossing $30,082,031 with 207,979 attendees from 15 shows in her second leg of North America.

== Set list ==
This set list is from the March 9, 2018, concert in Chicago. It does not represent all concerts for the duration of the tour.

1. "Get the Party Started"
2. "Beautiful Trauma"
3. "Just Like a Pill"
4. "Who Knew"
5. "Revenge"
6. "Funhouse" / "Just a Girl"
7. "Smells Like Teen Spirit"
8. "Secrets"
9. "Try"
10. "Just Give Me a Reason"
11. "I'm Not Dead"
12. "Just like Fire"
13. "What About Us"
14. "For Now"
15. "Barbies"
16. "I Am Here"
17. "Fuckin' Perfect"
18. "Raise Your Glass"
19. "Blow Me (One Last Kiss)"

Encore

20. "So What"
21. "Glitter in the Air"

=== Notes ===
- During the March 20, 2018, concert in Toronto, Pink was joined by Dallas Green onstage to perform "You and Me" from their joint album, rose ave. (2014).
- During the May 31, 2018, concert in Los Angeles, Pink was joined by Gwen Stefani onstage in a joint surprise performance of "Just a Girl".
- "For Now" was not performed at selected dates.
- In 2019, "Walk Me Home" was added to the set list in place of "I'm Not Dead".
- Starting on April 6, 2019, concert in Vancouver, "Hustle" was performed at selected dates in place of "Smells Like Teen Spirit".
- During the May 21, 2019, concert in New York City, Pink was joined by Chris Stapleton onstage to perform "Love Me Anyway".
- During the concert in Dublin, Pink performed a cover of "River" by Bishop Briggs, "90 Days" (performed with Wrabel) and "Can We Pretend" were added to the set list, while "Walk Me Home" was performed acoustically. "Revenge", "Barbies" and "Glitter in the Air" were not performed.
- During the concert in Rio de Janeiro, a cover of "We Are the Champions" by Queen was performed in place of "For Now".

== Tour dates ==
List of 2018 concerts
Date (2018)	City	Country	Venue	Opening acts	Attendance	Revenue
March 1	Phoenix	United States	Talking Stick Resort Arena	KidCutUp	14,181 / 14,549	$1,906,176
March 3	Wichita	United States	Intrust Bank Arena	KidCutUp	11,894 / 12,047	$1,647,788
March 5	Tulsa	United States	BOK Center	KidCutUp	14,146 / 14,146	$1,734,989
March 6	Lincoln	United States	Pinnacle Bank Arena	KidCutUp	13,647 / 13,973	$1,755,144
March 9	Chicago	United States	United Center	KidCutUp	31,476 / 40,664	$4,254,230
March 10	Chicago	United States	United Center	KidCutUp	31,476 / 40,664	$4,254,230
March 12	Saint Paul	United States	Xcel Energy Center	KidCutUp	15,710 / 15,710	$2,217,347
March 14	St. Louis	United States	Scottrade Center	KidCutUp	15,026 / 15,403	$1,852,210
March 15	Kansas City	United States	Sprint Center	KidCutUp	14,068 / 14,298	$1,868,282
March 17	Indianapolis	United States	Bankers Life Fieldhouse	KidCutUp	14,544 / 14,719	$1,749,814
March 18	Grand Rapids	United States	Van Andel Arena	KidCutUp	11,764 / 11,764	$1,623,071
March 20	Toronto	Canada	Air Canada Centre	KidCutUp; Bleachers	34,315 / 34,315	$4,497,956
March 21	Toronto	Canada	Air Canada Centre	KidCutUp; Bleachers	34,315 / 34,315	$4,497,956
March 27	Louisville	United States	KFC Yum! Center	KidCutUp; Bleachers	17,445 / 17,762	$2,024,356
March 28	Cleveland	United States	Quicken Loans Arena	KidCutUp; Bleachers	15,562 / 15,938	$1,912,595
April 4	New York City	United States	Madison Square Garden	KidCutUp; Bleachers	30,286 / 30,286	$5,320,560
April 5	New York City	United States	Madison Square Garden	KidCutUp; Bleachers	30,286 / 30,286	$5,320,560
April 7	Pittsburgh	United States	PPG Paints Arena	KidCutUp; Bleachers	16,708 / 16,708	$2,210,603
April 9	Boston	United States	TD Garden	KidCutUp; Bleachers	32,403 / 32,403	$4,668,640
April 10	Boston	United States	TD Garden	KidCutUp; Bleachers	32,403 / 32,403	$4,668,640
April 13	Philadelphia	United States	Wells Fargo Center	KidCutUp	18,191 / 18,191	$2,839,340
April 14	Newark	United States	Prudential Center	KidCutUp	15,687 / 15,687	$2,684,824
April 16	Washington, D.C.	United States	Capital One Arena	KidCutUp; Bleachers	32,583 / 32,583	$4,498,018
April 17	Washington, D.C.	United States	Capital One Arena	KidCutUp; Bleachers	32,583 / 32,583	$4,498,018
April 19	Charlottesville	United States	John Paul Jones Arena	KidCutUp	13,014 / 13,014	$1,645,760
April 21	Atlanta	United States	Philips Arena	KidCutUp	12,441 / 12,441	$1,661,156
April 24	Orlando	United States	Amway Center	KidCutUp	15,109 / 15,109	$2,171,487
April 25	Sunrise	United States	BB&T Center	KidCutUp	15,999 / 15,999	$2,184,919
April 27 (Note: The concert of April 27, 2018, at Toyota Center in Houston was originally planned to take place on April 29, 2018, but was rescheduled to avoid any potential conflict with the Houston Rockets playoff game.)	Houston	United States	Toyota Center	KidCutUp	25,615 / 25,615	$3,391,204
April 28	Houston	United States	Toyota Center	KidCutUp	25,615 / 25,615	$3,391,204
May 1	Dallas	United States	American Airlines Center	Julia Michaels	29,206 / 29,206	$3,642,876
May 2	Dallas	United States	American Airlines Center	Julia Michaels	29,206 / 29,206	$3,642,876
May 8	Denver	United States	Pepsi Center	KidCutUp	17,446 / 17,446	$2,160,741
May 9	Salt Lake City	United States	Vivint Smart Home Arena	KidCutUp	14,254 / 14,254	$1,947,385
May 12	Vancouver	Canada	Rogers Arena	KidCutUp	16,989 / 16,989	$2,349,769
May 13	Seattle	United States	KeyArena	KidCutUp	14,027 / 14,027	$2,229,945
May 15	Portland	United States	Moda Center	KidCutUp	15,757 / 15,757	$2,114,035
May 18	Oakland	United States	Oracle Arena	KidCutUp	32,596 / 32,596	$4,715,555
May 19	Oakland	United States	Oracle Arena	KidCutUp	32,596 / 32,596	$4,715,555
May 22	Fresno	United States	Save Mart Center	KidCutUp	12,721 / 12,721	$1,717,899
May 23	Ontario	United States	Citizens Business Bank Arena	KidCutUp	9,597 / 9,597	$1,457,009
May 25	Anaheim	United States	Honda Center	KidCutUp	16,125 / 16,125	$2,014,710
May 26	Las Vegas	United States	T-Mobile Arena	KidCutUp	17,019 / 17,019	$2,656,351
May 28	San Diego	United States	Valley View Casino Center	KidCutUp	11,872 / 11,872	$1,664,733
May 31	Los Angeles	United States	Staples Center	KidCutUp	17,047 / 17,047	$2,358,686
June 1	Inglewood	United States	The Forum	KidCutUp	14,777 / 14,777	$2,307,175
July 3	Perth	Australia	RAC Arena	The Rubens; KidCutUp	59,553 / 59,553	$7,581,640
July 4	Perth	Australia	RAC Arena	The Rubens; KidCutUp	59,553 / 59,553	$7,581,640
July 6	Perth	Australia	RAC Arena	The Rubens; KidCutUp	59,553 / 59,553	$7,581,640
July 7	Perth	Australia	RAC Arena	The Rubens; KidCutUp	59,553 / 59,553	$7,581,640
July 10	Adelaide	Australia	Entertainment Centre Arena	The Rubens; KidCutUp	38,105 / 38,648	$5,156,359
July 11	Adelaide	Australia	Entertainment Centre Arena	The Rubens; KidCutUp	38,105 / 38,648	$5,156,359
July 13	Adelaide	Australia	Entertainment Centre Arena	The Rubens; KidCutUp	38,105 / 38,648	$5,156,359
July 14	Adelaide	Australia	Entertainment Centre Arena	The Rubens; KidCutUp	38,105 / 38,648	$5,156,359
July 16	Melbourne	Australia	Rod Laver Arena	The Rubens; KidCutUp	157,811 / 160,072 (Note: The score data is combined from the shows held at the Rod Laver Arena from July 16, 17, 19, 20, 22, 23, 25, 27, 28; August 28 and 29, 2018, respectively.)	$20,213,756
July 17	Melbourne	Australia	Rod Laver Arena	The Rubens; KidCutUp	157,811 / 160,072	$20,213,756
July 19	Melbourne	Australia	Rod Laver Arena	The Rubens; KidCutUp	157,811 / 160,072	$20,213,756
July 20	Melbourne	Australia	Rod Laver Arena	The Rubens; KidCutUp	157,811 / 160,072	$20,213,756
July 22	Melbourne	Australia	Rod Laver Arena	The Rubens; KidCutUp	157,811 / 160,072	$20,213,756
July 23	Melbourne	Australia	Rod Laver Arena	The Rubens; KidCutUp	157,811 / 160,072	$20,213,756
July 25	Melbourne	Australia	Rod Laver Arena	The Rubens; KidCutUp	157,811 / 160,072	$20,213,756
July 27	Melbourne	Australia	Rod Laver Arena	The Rubens; KidCutUp	157,811 / 160,072	$20,213,756
July 28	Melbourne	Australia	Rod Laver Arena	The Rubens; KidCutUp	157,811 / 160,072	$20,213,756
August 4	Sydney	Australia	Qudos Bank Arena	The Rubens; KidCutUp	143,579 / 148,248 (Note: The score data is combined from the shows held at the Qudos Bank Arena from August 4, 11, 12, 24, 25, 26; September 17, 18 and 19, 2018, respectively.)	$18,566,707
August 11	Sydney	Australia	Qudos Bank Arena	The Rubens; KidCutUp	143,579 / 148,248	$18,566,707
August 12	Sydney	Australia	Qudos Bank Arena	The Rubens; KidCutUp	143,579 / 148,248	$18,566,707
August 14	Brisbane	Australia	Brisbane Entertainment Centre	The Rubens; KidCutUp	90,292 / 92,078	$11,331,336
August 15	Brisbane	Australia	Brisbane Entertainment Centre	The Rubens; KidCutUp	90,292 / 92,078	$11,331,336
August 17	Brisbane	Australia	Brisbane Entertainment Centre	The Rubens; KidCutUp	90,292 / 92,078	$11,331,336
August 18	Brisbane	Australia	Brisbane Entertainment Centre	The Rubens; KidCutUp	90,292 / 92,078	$11,331,336
August 20	Brisbane	Australia	Brisbane Entertainment Centre	The Rubens; KidCutUp	90,292 / 92,078	$11,331,336
August 21	Brisbane	Australia	Brisbane Entertainment Centre	The Rubens; KidCutUp	90,292 / 92,078	$11,331,336
August 22	Brisbane	Australia	Brisbane Entertainment Centre	The Rubens; KidCutUp	90,292 / 92,078	$11,331,336
August 24 (Note: The concert of August 24, 2018, at Qudos Bank Arena in Sydney was originally planned to take place on August 3, 2018, but was rescheduled due to upper respiratory infection.)	Sydney	Australia	Qudos Bank Arena	The Rubens; KidCutUp		
August 25	Sydney	Australia	Qudos Bank Arena	The Rubens; KidCutUp		
August 26	Sydney	Australia	Qudos Bank Arena	The Rubens; KidCutUp		
August 28	Melbourne	Australia	Rod Laver Arena	The Rubens; KidCutUp		
August 29	Melbourne	Australia	Rod Laver Arena	The Rubens; KidCutUp		
September 1	Dunedin	New Zealand	Forsyth Barr Stadium	The Rubens; KidCutUp	37,084 / 37,470	$6,313,414
September 4	Auckland	New Zealand	Spark Arena	The Rubens; KidCutUp	71,273 / 73,087	$11,934,273
September 5	Auckland	New Zealand	Spark Arena	The Rubens; KidCutUp	71,273 / 73,087	$11,934,273
September 7	Auckland	New Zealand	Spark Arena	The Rubens; KidCutUp	71,273 / 73,087	$11,934,273
September 8	Auckland	New Zealand	Spark Arena	The Rubens; KidCutUp	71,273 / 73,087	$11,934,273
September 10	Auckland	New Zealand	Spark Arena	The Rubens; KidCutUp	71,273 / 73,087	$11,934,273
September 11	Auckland	New Zealand	Spark Arena	The Rubens; KidCutUp	71,273 / 73,087	$11,934,273
September 17 (Note: The concerts of September 17, 18 and 19, 2018, at Qudos Bank Arena in Sydney were originally planned to take place on August 6, 7 and 9, 2018, but were rescheduled due to Gastro Bug.)	Sydney	Australia	Qudos Bank Arena	The Rubens; KidCutUp		
September 18	Sydney	Australia	Qudos Bank Arena	The Rubens; KidCutUp		
September 19	Sydney	Australia	Qudos Bank Arena	The Rubens; KidCutUp		

List of 2019 concerts
Date (2019)	City	Country	Venue	Opening acts	Attendance	Revenue
March 1	Sunrise	United States	BB&T Center	Julia Michaels; KidCutUp	14,883 / 14,883	$2,463,165
March 3	Tampa	United States	Amalie Arena	Julia Michaels; KidCutUp	15,068 / 15,068	$2,373,771
March 5	Jacksonville	United States	Jacksonville Veterans Memorial Arena	Julia Michaels; KidCutUp	11,700 / 11,700	$1,915,530
March 7	Columbia	United States	Colonial Life Arena	Julia Michaels; KidCutUp	13,481 / 13,481	$1,722,813
March 9	Charlotte	United States	Spectrum Center	Julia Michaels; KidCutUp	15,596 / 15,596	$2,578,534
March 10	Nashville	United States	Bridgestone Arena	Julia Michaels; KidCutUp	14,336 / 14,336	$2,326,690
March 12	Atlanta	United States	State Farm Arena	Julia Michaels; KidCutUp	11,472 / 11,472	$1,586,831
March 14	Birmingham	United States	Legacy Arena	Julia Michaels; KidCutUp	13,959 / 13,959	$1,487,637
March 16	Bossier City	United States	CenturyLink Center	Julia Michaels; KidCutUp	12,710 / 12,710	$1,423,056
March 17	New Orleans	United States	Smoothie King Center	Julia Michaels; KidCutUp	14,500 / 14,500	$2,215,600
March 19	Houston	United States	Toyota Center	Julia Michaels; KidCutUp	12,822 / 12,822	$1,269,264
March 21	San Antonio	United States	AT&T Center	Julia Michaels; KidCutUp	15,651 / 15,651	$2,115,377
March 23	Oklahoma City	United States	Chesapeake Energy Arena	Julia Michaels; KidCutUp	13,820 / 13,820	$2,049,271
March 24	Dallas	United States	American Airlines Center	Julia Michaels; KidCutUp	14,658 / 14,658	$2,067,277
March 30	Glendale	United States	Gila River Arena	Julia Michaels; KidCutUp	13,737 / 13,737	$2,363,364
April 1	Denver	United States	Pepsi Center	Julia Michaels; KidCutUp	14,548 / 14,548	$2,117,678
April 3	Salt Lake City	United States	Vivint Smart Home Arena	Julia Michaels; KidCutUp	13,586 / 13,586	$1,889,389
April 5	Vancouver	Canada	Rogers Arena	Julia Michaels; KidCutUp	30,763 / 30,763	$3,631,003
April 6	Vancouver	Canada	Rogers Arena	Julia Michaels; KidCutUp	30,763 / 30,763	$3,631,003
April 8	Portland	United States	Moda Center	Julia Michaels; KidCutUp	14,942 / 14,942	$2,159,245
April 10	Sacramento	United States	Golden 1 Center	Julia Michaels; KidCutUp	14,881 / 14,881	$2,628,946
April 12	Las Vegas	United States	T-Mobile Arena	Julia Michaels; KidCutUp	16,130 / 16,130	$2,340,138
April 13	Anaheim	United States	Honda Center	Julia Michaels; KidCutUp	12,832 / 12,832	$1,925,556
April 15	Los Angeles	United States	Staples Center	Julia Michaels; KidCutUp	13,699 / 13,699	$1,336,647
April 17	San Jose	United States	SAP Center	Julia Michaels; KidCutUp	14,055 / 14,055	$2,125,545
April 19	Inglewood	United States	The Forum	Julia Michaels; KidCutUp	14,354 / 14,354	$2,074,363
April 26 (Note: The concert of April 26, 2019, at Little Caesars Arena in Detroit was originally planned to take place on March 25, 2018, but was rescheduled due to illness.)	Detroit	United States	Little Caesars Arena	Julia Michaels; KidCutUp	30,499 / 30,499	$4,594,641
April 27	Detroit	United States	Little Caesars Arena	Julia Michaels; KidCutUp	30,499 / 30,499	$4,594,641
April 30	Indianapolis	United States	Bankers Life Fieldhouse	Julia Michaels; KidCutUp	14,444 / 14,444	$2,011,671
May 2	Milwaukee	United States	Fiserv Forum	Julia Michaels; KidCutUp	13,331 / 13,331	$2,336,580
May 4	Fargo	United States	Fargodome	Julia Michaels; KidCutUp	22,164 / 22,164	$2,927,135
May 5	Saint Paul	United States	Xcel Energy Center	Julia Michaels; KidCutUp	15,820 / 15,820	$2,735,448
May 7	Omaha	United States	CHI Health Center Omaha	Julia Michaels; KidCutUp	15,050 / 15,050	$2,187,858
May 9	Lexington	United States	Rupp Arena	Julia Michaels; KidCutUp	17,256 / 17,256	$1,771,383
May 11	Columbus	United States	Schottenstein Center	Julia Michaels; KidCutUp	14,907 / 14,907	$2,281,760
May 17 (Note: The concert of May 17, 2019, at Bell Centre in Montreal was originally planned to take place on March 23, 2018, but was rescheduled due to illness.)	Montreal	Canada	Bell Centre	Julia Michaels; KidCutUp	32,780 / 33,222	$4,355,760
May 18	Montreal	Canada	Bell Centre	Julia Michaels; KidCutUp	32,780 / 33,222	$4,355,760
May 21	New York City	United States	Madison Square Garden	Julia Michaels; KidCutUp	29,997 / 29,997	$5,527,014
May 22	New York City	United States	Madison Square Garden	Julia Michaels; KidCutUp	29,997 / 29,997	$5,527,014
June 16	Amsterdam	Netherlands	Johan Cruyff Arena	Vance Joy; Bang Bang Romeo; KidCutUp	51,089 / 51,089	$4,563,319
June 18	Dublin	Ireland	RDS Arena	Vance Joy; Bang Bang Romeo; KidCutUp	35,282 / 35,282	$3,816,640
June 20	Cardiff	Wales	Principality Stadium	Vance Joy; Bang Bang Romeo; KidCutUp	58,595 / 58,595	$6,765,880
June 22	Glasgow	Scotland	Hampden Park	Vance Joy; Bang Bang Romeo; KidCutUp	102,273 / 102,273	$12,014,516
June 23	Glasgow	Scotland	Hampden Park	Vance Joy; Bang Bang Romeo; KidCutUp	102,273 / 102,273	$12,014,516
June 25	Liverpool	England	Anfield Stadium	Vance Joy; Bang Bang Romeo; KidCutUp	44,042 / 44,042	$5,335,757
June 27 (Note: The concert of June 27, 2019, at Werchter Festival Park is part of Rock Werchter festival.)	Werchter	Belgium	Werchter Festival Park	—N/a	—N/a	—N/a
June 29	London	England	Wembley Stadium	Vance Joy; Bang Bang Romeo; KidCutUp	145,230 / 145,230	$16,665,313
June 30	London	England	Wembley Stadium	Vance Joy; Bang Bang Romeo; KidCutUp	145,230 / 145,230	$16,665,313
July 3	Nanterre	France	Paris La Défense Arena	Vance Joy; Bang Bang Romeo; KidCutUp	36,295 / 36,295	$3,358,518
July 5	Cologne	Germany	RheinEnergieStadion	Vance Joy; Bang Bang Romeo; KidCutUp	77,313 / 77,313	$8,091,671
July 6	Cologne	Germany	RheinEnergieStadion	Vance Joy; Bang Bang Romeo; KidCutUp	77,313 / 77,313	$8,091,671
July 8	Hamburg	Germany	Volksparkstadion	Vance Joy; Bang Bang Romeo; KidCutUp	39,743 / 39,743	$4,061,875
July 10	Stuttgart	Germany	Mercedes-Benz Arena	Vance Joy; Bang Bang Romeo; KidCutUp	42,495 / 42,495	$4,632,086
July 12	Hanover	Germany	HDI-Arena	Vance Joy; Bang Bang Romeo; KidCutUp	43,452 / 43,452	$4,625,693
July 14	Berlin	Germany	Olympiastadion	Vance Joy; Bang Bang Romeo; KidCutUp	54,114 / 54,114	$5,649,498
July 20	Warsaw	Poland	PGE Narodowy	Vance Joy; Bang Bang Romeo; KidCutUp	46,964 / 46,964	$3,509,909
July 22	Frankfurt	Germany	Commerzbank-Arena	Vance Joy; Bang Bang Romeo; KidCutUp	39,743 / 39,743	$4,261,701
July 24	Vienna	Austria	Ernst-Happel-Stadion	Vance Joy; Bang Bang Romeo; KidCutUp	55,873 / 55,873	$5,626,465
July 26	Munich	Germany	Olympiastadion	Vance Joy; Bang Bang Romeo; KidCutUp	113,564 / 113,564	$11,764,911
July 27	Munich	Germany	Olympiastadion	Vance Joy; Bang Bang Romeo; KidCutUp	113,564 / 113,564	$11,764,911
July 30	Zürich	Switzerland	Letzigrund	Vance Joy; KidCutUp	45,287 / 45,287	$5,956,105
August 3	Stockholm	Sweden	Tele2 Arena	Vance Joy; Bang Bang Romeo; KidCutUp	33,943 / 33,943	$3,190,660
August 5	Oslo	Norway	Telenor Arena	Vance Joy; Bang Bang Romeo; KidCutUp	23,851 / 23,851	$2,511,154
August 7	Horsens	Denmark	CASA Arena Horsens	Vance Joy; Bang Bang Romeo; KidCutUp	25,000 / 25,000	$2,812,500
August 9	Gelsenkirchen	Germany	Veltins-Arena	Vance Joy; Kassalla; KidCutUp	34,278 / 34,278	$3,414,207
August 11	The Hague	Netherlands	Malieveld	Vance Joy; Davina Michelle; KidCutUp	46,271 / 46,271	$4,214,772
August 16	Uniondale	United States	Nassau Coliseum	Wrabel; KidCutUp	12,339 / 12,339	$2,092,479
August 18 (Note: The concerts of August 18 and 19, 2019, at Scotiabank Arena in Toronto were originally planned to take place respectively on May 13 and 14, 2019, but were rescheduled due to illness.)	Toronto	Canada	Scotiabank Arena	Wrabel; KidCutUp	34,886 / 34,886	$4,177,053
August 19	Toronto	Canada	Scotiabank Arena	Wrabel; KidCutUp	34,886 / 34,886	$4,177,053
October 5 (Note: The concert of October 5, 2019, at Barra Olympic Park in Rio de Janeiro is part of Rock in Rio festival.)	Rio de Janeiro	Brazil	Barra Olympic Park	The Black Eyed Peas; H.E.R. Anitta	100,000/100,000	—N/a
November 2 (Note: The concert of November 2, 2019, at Circuit of the Americas in Austin is part of the 2019 Formula One United States Grand Prix Concert Series.)	Austin	United States	Circuit of the Americas	—N/a	—N/a	—N/a
Total					3,080,833 / 3,104,344	$397,300,000

=== Cancelled shows ===
List of cancelled concerts
Date (2019)	City	Country	Venue	Reason
April 15	Fresno	United States	Save Mart Center	Schedule changes

== Personnel ==
- Lead vocals, aerobatics, dancing, piano, executive producer, creator – P!nk
- Musical director, keyboards – Jason Chapman
- Drums – Mark Schulman
- Lead guitar – Justin Derrico
- Bass guitar, vocals – Eva Gardner
- Keyboards, rhythm guitar, vocals – Adriana Balic
- Violin, cello, vocals – Jessy Greene
- Vocals – Stacy Campbell
- Vocals – Jenny Douglas-Foote
- Dancing, dance captain – Tracy Shibata
- Dancing, aerial captain, aerial choreography – Loriel Hennington
- Dancing – Remi Bakkar
- Dancing – Khasan Brailsford
- Dancing – Reina Hidalgo
- Dancing – Shannon Holtzapffel
- Dancing – Jeremy Hudson
- Dancing – Madelyne Spang
- Dancing – Justin Lutz
- Dancing – Anthony Westlake
- Choreography, aerial choreography – Nick Florez
- Choreography, aerial choreography – Rj Durell
- Stage director, executive producer – Baz Halpin
- Musical Director, arrangements – Paul Mirkovich

== See also ==
- List of highest-grossing concert tours by women
