= Beautiful Trauma =

Studio album by Pink
- Released: October 13, 2017
- Recorded: 2015–2017
- Studios: Earthstar Creation Center (Venice, California); Willow-Valley (Göteborg, Sweden); Azteca Market (Glassell Park, Los Angeles)
- Genre: Pop
- Length: 51:08
- Label: RCA
- Producers: Roger Davies; Pink; Jack Antonoff; busbee; Greg Kurstin; Steve Mac; Billy Mann; Max Martin; Oscar Holter; Shellback; The Struts

Pink chronology
The Truth About Love (2012)	Beautiful Trauma (2017)	Hurts 2B Human (2019)

Singles from Beautiful Trauma
- 1. "What About Us" Released: August 10, 2017; 2. "Beautiful Trauma" Released: November 21, 2017; 3. "Whatever You Want" Released: June 4, 2018; 4. "Secrets" Released: August 2, 2018

Beautiful Trauma is the seventh studio album by American singer-songwriter Pink. It was released on October 13, 2017, by RCA Records. Following her previous album The Truth About Love, Pink took a career hiatus to focus on her personal life and become reinspired. Beautiful Trauma developed over a three-year period starting in 2015. She collaborated with a variety of producers, enlisting help from collaborators such as Greg Kurstin, Max Martin, Jack Antonoff, and Shellback. Pink and her manager, Roger Davies, served as the album's executive producers. Primarily a pop record, it incorporates influences from EDM and folk. The lyrical content reflects primarily on themes of love, heartbreak, and the duality of life, as well as expressing societal and global issues.

Beautiful Trauma received mixed reviews from music critics, many of whom praised its overall production and Pink's vocals. However, some thought it was too calculated and formulaic, questioning its originality. The album debuted at number one on the US Billboard 200 chart, selling 408,000 album-equivalent units becoming Pink's highest first-week sales to date. It was later certified platinum by the Recording Industry Association of America (RIAA) for sales of 1,000,000 certified units. The album also reached the summit in over 10 other countries including Australia, Canada, New Zealand, Switzerland, and the United Kingdom, and top 10 positions in major music markets. According to the International Federation of the Phonographic Industry (IFPI), it was among the best-selling albums globally in 2017 and 2018, and has sold over 3,000,000 copies worldwide.

"What About Us" was released as the lead single from Beautiful Trauma. It was a commercial success, topping the national charts of eight countries and peaking within the top 10 in 12 others, while reaching number 13 on the US Billboard Hot 100. The second single is the title track, which was moderately successful and attained top 40 positions on the charts of over 10 countries, while "Whatever You Want" and "Secrets" had limited releases in June and August 2018, respectively. The album was promoted by the Beautiful Trauma World Tour which ran from March 2018 to November 2019 and grossed over $390,000,000, at the time the second highest-grossing tour by a female artist. Beautiful Trauma received a Grammy nomination for Best Pop Vocal Album at the 61st awards ceremony, while "What About Us" was nominated for Best Pop Solo Performance at the 60th Grammy Awards.

== Background ==
In September 2012, Pink released her sixth studio album The Truth About Love. The electropop and rock-influenced pop album received critical acclaim and became an international commercial success, having sold approximately 7,000,000 copies worldwide. The album's associated world tour ran from February 2013 to January 2014. In March 2014, it was reported that Pink had signed a new multi-album record deal with RCA Records. In October 2014, she released a collaborative album titled rose ave., with Canadian singer-songwriter Dallas Green, under the name You+Me. Pink subsequently took a hiatus from her career. However, she released some songs during this period, including "Today's the Day", used as a theme song for the 13th season of The Ellen DeGeneres Show, and "Just Like Fire" featured on the soundtrack of the 2016 film Alice Through the Looking Glass. In April 2016, Pink confirmed that she was going through the writing process for her upcoming album via a post on her Instagram account, prompting media speculation about a potential Pink release during the second half of that year. The album's creation and release were ultimately pushed back to 2017 after Pink gave birth to her second child, a son named Jameson Moon Hart, on December 26, 2016. The singer announced in July 2017 that she was filming a music video for an upcoming single. Pink later shared a recording from the set of the video on her social media page, captioned: "Video #new #fyeah #itsallhappening".

== Writing and inspiration ==
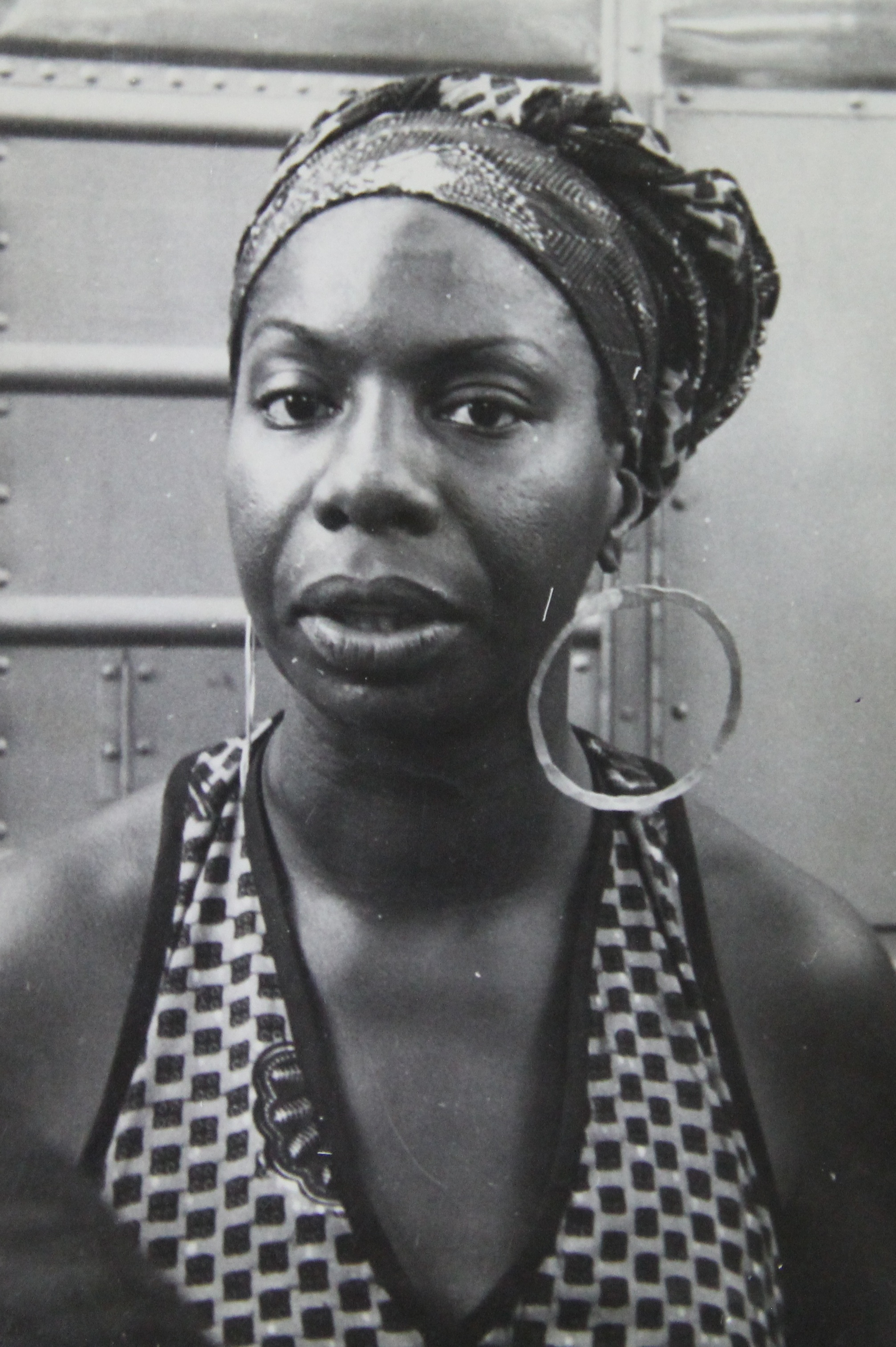
Pink described "You Get My Love" as her "biggest attempt" to emulate one of her influences, Nina Simone (pictured).

The development process for Beautiful Trauma took place over three years, the longest that Pink has ever worked on an album. Early writing sessions for the album were unsuccessful; Pink recalled that she spent a year writing slow and sad songs. The singer added, "for a while, I didn't have anything to say, except for dumb sad stuff". However, Pink considered her career hiatus beneficial, citing it as helping her to become reinspired and "find [her] voice again". During the hiatus, she concentrated on her family and living "a normal life", which influenced her music. In an interview with Entertainment Weekly, Pink said that Beautiful Trauma reflects her life at that time, and her focus was "to be as honest as I could". She drew inspiration for her songwriting from several events, including a miscarriage, the 2016 United States presidential election and her dad being diagnosed with cancer.

Pink collaborated with a handful of producers and songwriters for Beautiful Trauma enlisting the assistance of longtime collaborators, such as Billy Mann, Greg Kurstin, Max Martin, and Shellback, and new project partners like Johnny McDaid, Julia Michaels, and Jack Antonoff. 50 songs were composed over the course of the album's development, including "Wild Hearts Can't Be Broken". Initially composed for the 2015 historical period drama film Suffragette, the song was inspired by the early 20th-century movement of the same name. "You Get My Love" was written and produced by Pink and Tobias Jesso Jr., at the Earthstar Creation Center in Venice. The track was recorded in 2016, while Pink was pregnant, an experience she deemed as "very sober". Pink described the track as "the best vocal performance I've ever done in my life", and credited American singer Nina Simone as the major influence behind her vocal interpretation.

In 2016, Pink co-wrote "I Am Here" with Billy Mann and Christian Medice in Los Angeles. The following year, Pink contacted Mann in July after she had decided to record the song with a local gospel choir. The pair traveled to Philadelphia and booked a recording session at Houser Audio, with a 30-piece choir. Mann and Bill Jolly arranged the voices; Jolly also conducted the choir. "Revenge" was written by Pink, Max Martin, and Shellback. After she wrote rap verses, Pink felt that the song was suitable for Eminem. Eventually, she sent him an e-mail, confessing her love and admiration for the rapper, and asking for a collaboration. While he was in Rio de Janeiro, Eminem responded positively to her request. Four days later, he sent back an e-mail to Pink with his recorded verse. Speaking of Eminem, she commented: "I think he's a lyrical genius, I think he's one of the best that ever did it."

== Music and lyrical interpretation ==
=== Overview ===
Beautiful Trauma is primarily a pop record that incorporates elements of EDM and folk music. Lyrically, the album has an emotional theme, addressing insecurities and imperfect relationships, as well as the singer's concerns about societal and global issues. Josh Hurst of Slant Magazine characterized Beautiful Trauma as a pop album "about bent-and-broken people", while Rolling Stone staff wrote that most of the songs analyze "married life, motherhood and the state of the world". Pink explained that the album marks a change in her vocal style. As a result of her pregnancy, her voice became clearer. Most critics noted that Beautiful Trauma includes predominantly ballads with "dramatic" choruses; Pink's manager Roger Davies called it "just a continuation of the previous records".

=== Songs analysis ===
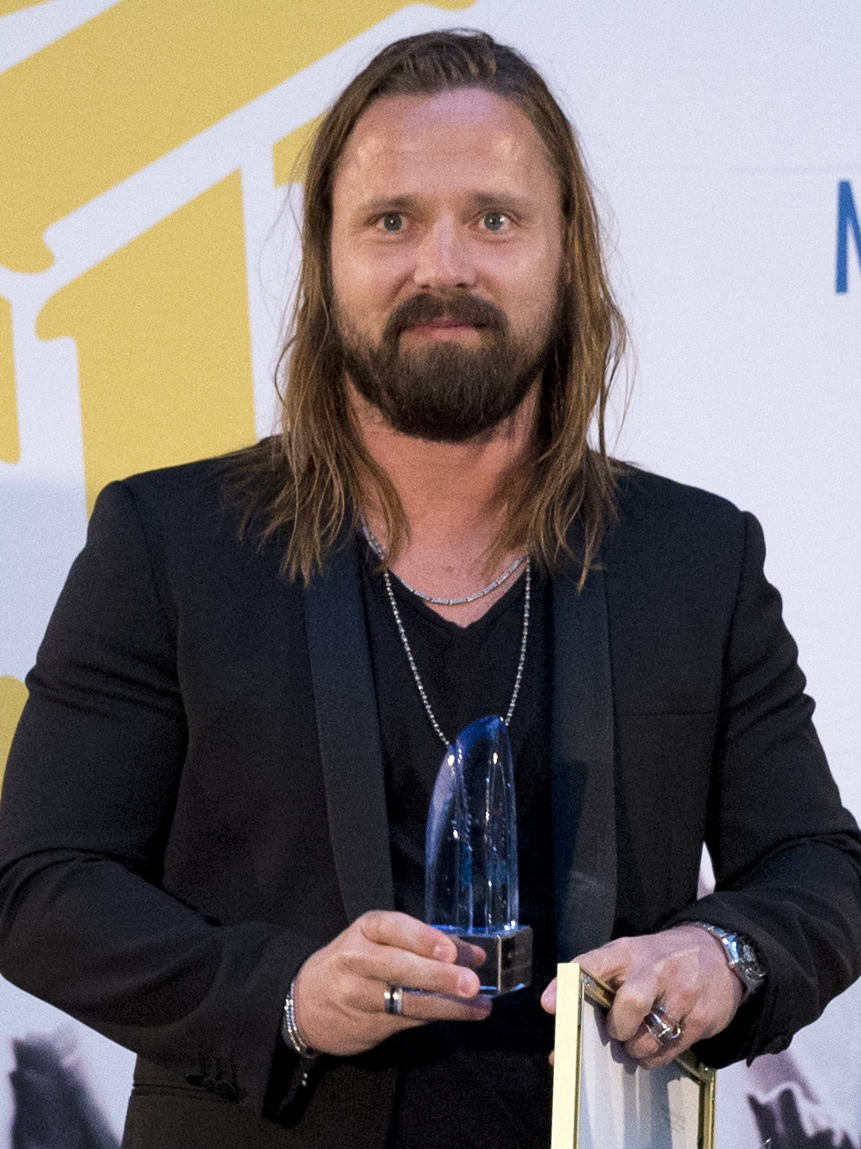
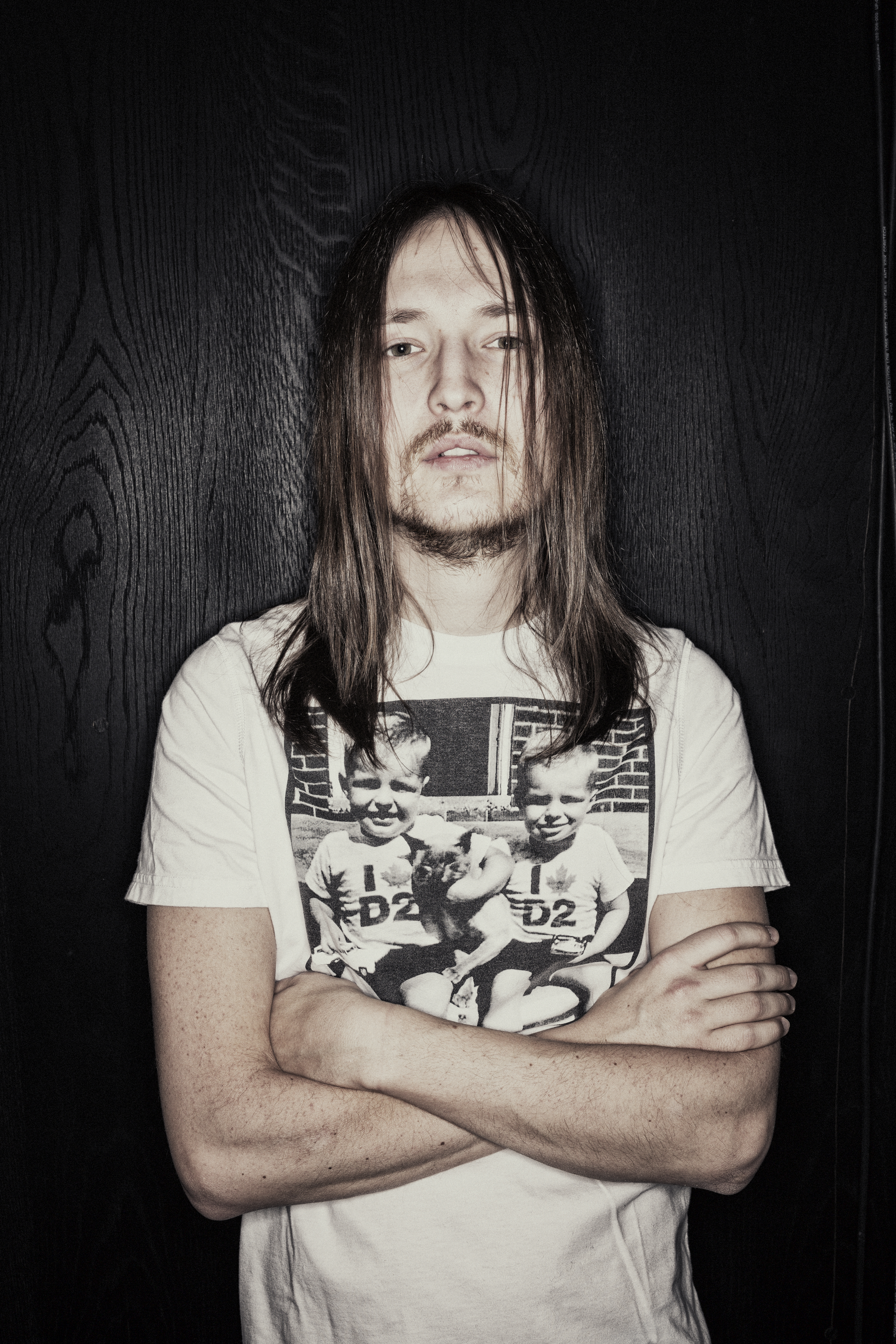
Max Martin (left) and Shellback (right) both co-wrote and co-produced three songs on Beautiful Trauma.

The opening and titular track, "Beautiful Trauma", is a power pop and pop rock song produced by Jack Antonoff. Its composition consists of "hammered" piano chords backed by synthesizers and an orchestra, while the lyrics delve into a long-term troubled relationship and compare it to drug addiction. Described by Pink as a "funny record", "Revenge" is a "bad-romance duet" with Eminem. Alternating between rap and sung sections, the track is centered on the subjects of betrayal, cheating, and unfaithfulness. "Whatever You Want", the third song, is a "confessional" pop rock track produced by Max Martin and Shellback and inspired by the difficulties Pink faced in her relationship with husband Carey Hart. Both Jamie Otsa from Drowned in Sound and Evan Sawdey of PopMatters noted similarities between the track and Radiohead's 1995 song, "High and Dry", referring to "more than a few chord changes". The lead single from Beautiful Trauma, "What About Us", was written by Pink, McDaid, and Steve McCutcheon; production was handled by McCutcheon. An EDM song with influences of four on the floor, "What About Us" starts as a ballad and appears to be about a relationship at first glance. The political lyrics depict a "peaceful message" of tolerance and unity for the people who feel ignored and abandoned.

"But We Lost It" is a piano ballad, deemed as an "affecting damaged" love song, while "Barbies" contains folk elements and lyrics about the pressure of growing up while longing for a simpler time. The seventh song, "Where We Go", details a damaged relationship over a "Robin Schulz-like loping" guitar melody, according to Andrew Unterberger from Billboard. "For Now" is an adult contemporary power ballad, whereas "Secrets" blends pop and funk music, with elements of deep house and electronic music. "Better Life" is an R&B-flavored doo-wop track that incorporates gospel tones. The song finds Pink comparing herself to people on social media, with lyrics such as "I found myself up late feeling kinda jealous/ Looking at the bullshit, other people's wellness". "I Am Here" appears next, and it is an empowering song which includes a gospel choir and lyrics about Pink's "journey as a person". The twelfth and penultimate track, "Wild Hearts Can't Be Broken", was written by Pink and Michael Busbee as a "feminist chant" that depicts women fighting for equal rights and respect. Beautiful Trauma concludes with "You Get My Love", a piano ballad described as "raw" and "emotional". Pink's vocal runs were compared to those of Adele, Carole King, and Mariah Carey.

== Release and promotion ==
=== Live performances ===
Pink embarked on a promotional tour across Europe and North America to promote the release of Beautiful Trauma. The singer performed "What About Us" live for the first time at Waldbühne in Berlin, Germany, on August 11, 2017. During Pink's headline set at the V Festival that year she performed the song along with older material. At the 2017 MTV Video Music Awards, Pink was presented with the Michael Jackson Video Vanguard Award and sang the song as part of a greatest hits medley. On September 6, 2017, the singer held a special concert at The Theater in the Ace Hotel in Los Angeles, premiering tracks from the album to a room of specially invited fans. She also appeared on The Ellen DeGeneres Show the same day and performed "What About Us". On September 8, 2017, Pink performed the song for BBC Radio 1's Live Lounge, as well as "Who Knew", "Try", and a cover of "Stay with Me" by Sam Smith. She was a main headliner at the 2017 Kaaboo Del Mar Festival where her setlist included a performance of "What About Us" and other singles from her catalogue. On September 22 of that year, Pink performed a medley of "Raise Your Glass", "What About Us", "Funhouse", "Just Like Fire", and "So What" at the iHeartRadio Music Festival.

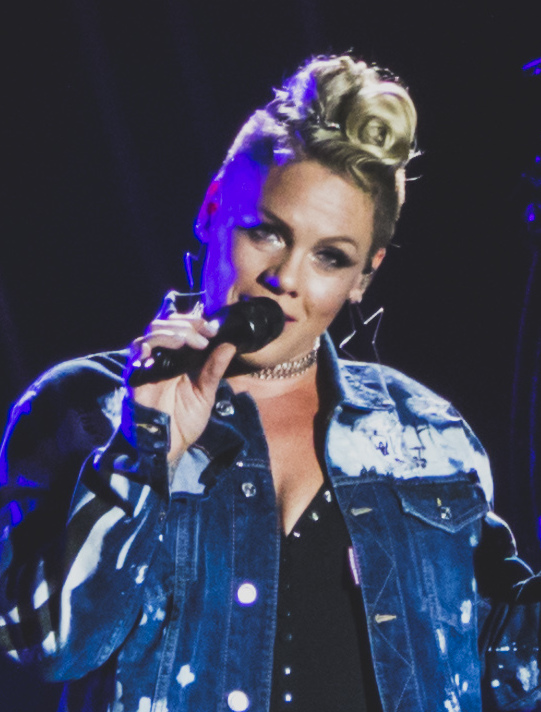
Pink during the performance of "What About Us" at her 2017 V Festival set

Concurrently with the release of Beautiful Trauma on October 13, 2017, Pink partnered with Apple Music and released On The Record: P!nk - Beautiful Trauma, a short documentary that includes scenes from the album's recording sessions. The following day, Pink appeared on Saturday Night Live and performed "What About Us", as well as "Beautiful Trauma" for the first time. Two days later, the singer was interviewed on Good Morning America and also performed the two tracks. On October 22, 2017, Pink performed during CBS Radio's We Can Survive benefit concert at the Hollywood Bowl for breast cancer awareness. Her setlist included "Barbies", "What About Us", and "Beautiful Trauma" from the album. On November 1, 2017, Pink appeared on Jimmy Kimmel Live! and sang "What About Us". She performed "Barbies" at the 51st Annual Country Music Association Awards on November 8 of that year, accompanied by a string quartet and two backing vocalists. Chris Parton of Rolling Stone called the performance "stunning and thoughtful". On November 15, 2017, Pink appeared on The Late Late Show with James Corden in the Carpool Karaoke segment, singing her previous singles as well as "What About Us" and "Beautiful Trauma".

At the 2017 American Music Awards, Pink performed the title track while hanging by a high wire in the air and walking on the side of the JW Marriott Hotel, Los Angeles. The singer collaborated with the aerial dance group Bandaloop for a heavily choreographed performance, which included backward flips, "stunning extensions", and other acrobatic moves. The performance was met with positive reviews from critics. Billboard listed it as the best performance of the night, with the staff adding that "what makes Pink such a special performance is that no matter the setting, it's still about the vocals first". In the United Kingdom, Pink promoted the album by performing "What About Us" on The Graham Norton Show on December 1, 2017. She also performed the song live on the finale of the 14th series of The X Factor UK two days later, along with "Beautiful Trauma". On December 5, 2017, Pink traveled to France and performed a concert at the Élysée Montmartre in Paris as part of the NRJ Music Tour. Her setlist included "What About Us" and "Beautiful Trauma". The singer later appeared on French television show Quotidien, where she was interviewed and performed "What About Us". On December 10, 2017, Pink performed the song again on The Voice of Germany. In 2018, she attended the 60th Annual Grammy Awards and performed "Wild Hearts Can't Be Broken", accompanied on stage by an ASL interpreter. Writing for People, Stephanie Petit called the performance "emotional", while Katie Atkinson of Billboard felt that Pink "nailed the impossibly high notes at the song's emotional climax". Following the performance, she released a music video for the song. Shot in black-and-white and directed by Sasha Samsonova, the accompanying music video sees Pink singing while sitting alone in a barren room, wearing a white tank top and distressed jeans. Taylor Seely of USA Today called the visual "stunning", while Desiree Murphy of Entertainment Tonight opined that "it's one of her most powerful music videos yet".

=== Singles ===
"What About Us" was released as the lead single from Beautiful Trauma on August 10, 2017. It received positive reviews from music critics, who praised the lyrical content and production, as well as Pink's vocals. The song was a commercial success, topping the national charts of eight countries and peaking within the top 10 in 12 others. In the US, "What About Us" peaked at number 13 on the Billboard Hot 100, topped the Adult Contemporary and Adult Pop Songs charts, and was certified platinum by the Recording Industry Association of America (RIAA), signifying sales of 1,000,000 certified units. An accompanying music video, directed by Georgia Hudson, and choreographed by Nick Florez and RJ Durell, known collectively as the GoldenBoyz, was released on August 16, 2017. The video's main theme was a lost generation of abandoned and unheard people uniting through the power of dance, symbolizing love.

"Revenge" had been slated for release as the second single from Beautiful Trauma but was cancelled in favor of the title track. "Beautiful Trauma" was made available as a promotional single on September 28, 2017, and was released to US contemporary hit radio stations on November 21 of that year as the second single. For further promotion, "Beautiful Trauma" was accompanied by a music video directed by the GoldenBoyz. The video portrays a married couple—Pink as a 1950s housewife and her husband, played by actor Channing Tatum—going through daily routines, and dancing in a series of bright-colored sets. The couple open up to each other during their "experimental phase", which includes scenes of cross-dressing and S&M. Commercially, the song performed moderately on record charts, reaching top 40 positions in over 10 countries, including Australia, Belgium (Flanders), and the UK.

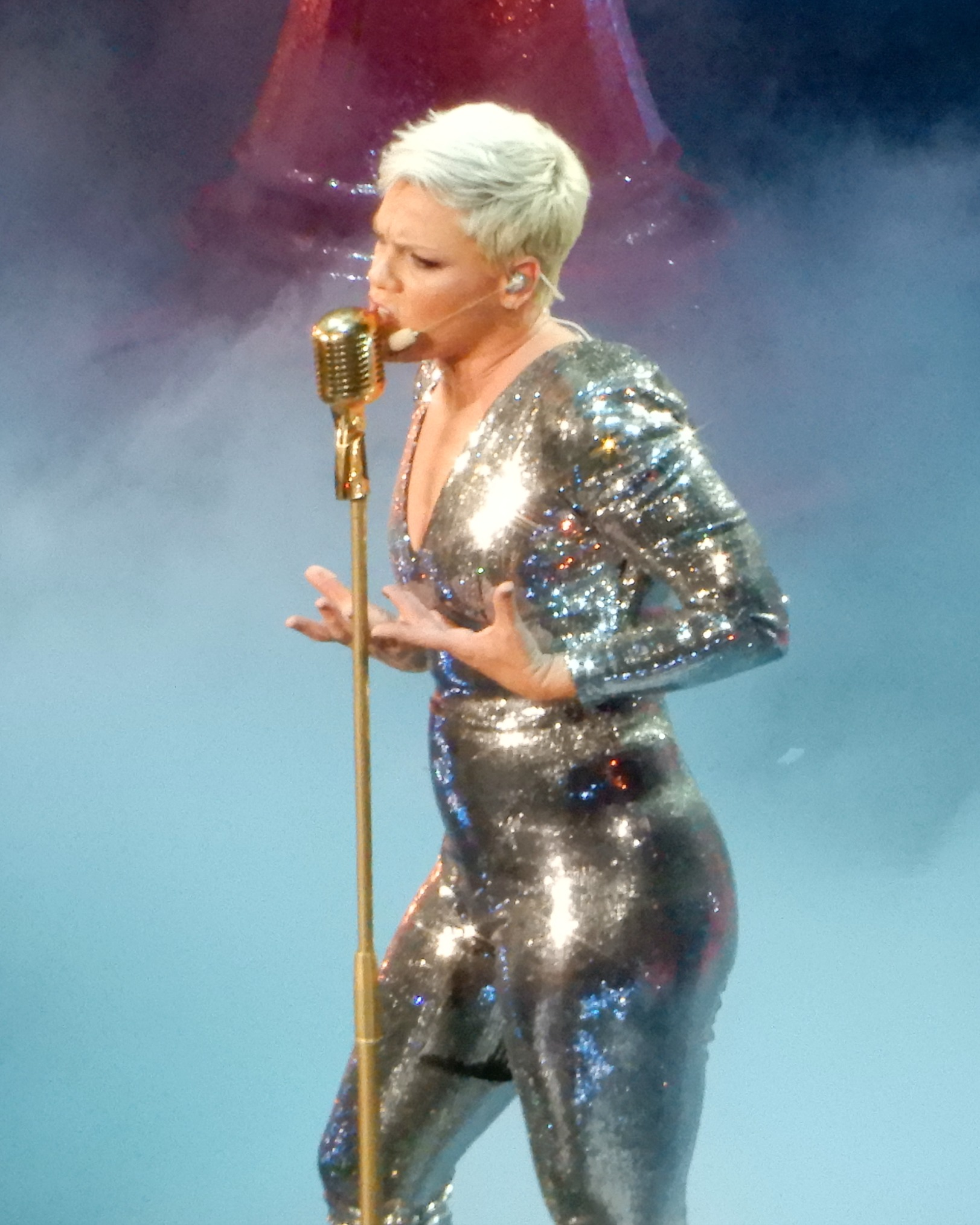
Pink performing "Beautiful Trauma" at Madison Square Garden

One week before the album's release, "Whatever You Want" was issued as a promotional single on October 5, 2017. An accompanying music video was released on March 1, 2018, showing scenes of Pink preparing for the Beautiful Trauma World Tour, interspersed with clips from both her performance at Super Bowl LII, her appearance at the 2017 MTV Video Music Awards, and scenes from On The Record: P!nk - Beautiful Trauma. The song was sent to US hot adult contemporary radio stations on June 4, 2018, as the album's third single. It peaked at number 11 on the US Adult Top 40 and number 22 on the Adult Contemporary chart. "Secrets" was released as the fourth and final single from Beautiful Trauma in Europe, along with a four-track remix EP. The song's music video was co-directed with Larn Poland and shot in Northbridge, Western Australia. Released on July 24, 2018, it shows Pink with her dancers in a graffiti-tagged warehouse, dancing and singing. "Secrets" topped the US Dance Club Songs chart, becoming the third song from Beautiful Trauma to do so, following on from "What About Us" and the title track.

=== Tour ===
To further promote the album, Pink announced on October 5, 2017, that she would embark on her seventh concert tour, the Beautiful Trauma World Tour, visiting venues in North America. The initial itinerary included 17 shows in Oceania, but because of overwhelming demand, additional dates were added. On May 3, 2018, Pink announced the second North American leg of the tour, starting in 2019, including rescheduled shows for Detroit and Montreal. In October of the same year, the Beautiful Trauma World Tour was extended further into 2019 with a European leg. Overall, it comprised 159 show dates, 89 in North America, 42 in Oceania, 27 in Europe, and one in South America. The tour generated positive critical reviews. Many critics praised the setlist, production, and Pink's vocals and her aerial acrobatics. The tour was a massive commercial success, becoming the eleventh highest-grossing tour of all time, and the second highest-grossing tour of all time by a female solo artist, earning $397,300,000 from over 3,000,000 tickets sold.

== Artwork and title ==
The artwork for Beautiful Trauma was unveiled when the album was announced on August 9, 2017. Shot by Kurt Iswarienko, the cover art shows Pink standing in front of a rundown gas station in a desert. She is wearing a bejeweled bustier and a white gown under an enormous silver jacket, and reflective sunglasses and hoop earrings. Pink said that the album title refers to the atrocities happening around the world and her willingness to see the world's good side. In an interview for The Guardian, she explained, "I named the album Beautiful Trauma because life is fucking traumatic. There's natural disasters at every turn". She continued, "but there's beautiful people [sic] in the world that are having a blast and being good to each other and helping others. Because I can be dark, I try to constantly remind myself that there's more good than bad".

== Critical reception ==
Professional ratings
Aggregate scores
Source	Rating
AnyDecentMusic?	5.7/10
Metacritic	62/100
Review scores
Source	Rating
AllMusic	3/5 stars
Drowned in Sound	7/10
Entertainment Weekly	A−
The Guardian	3/5 stars
Idolator	4/5 stars
The Independent	3/5 stars
PopMatters	4/10
Rolling Stone	3/5 stars
Slant Magazine	3/5 stars
USA Today	3.5/4 stars

Beautiful Trauma was met with generally mixed reviews from music critics. At Metacritic, which assigns a normalized rating out of 100 to reviews from mainstream critics, the album received an average score of 62, based on 9 reviews. Aggregator AnyDecentMusic? gave it 5.7 out of 10, based on their assessment of the critical consensus.

Patrick Ryan of USA Today praised the "stripped-back arrangements" for emphasizing Pink's abilities as a singer-songwriter, and observed the album's theme gravitates towards "her tumultuous relationship with Hart" and "achingly relatable anecdotes" about marriage, family, and maturing. Mike Nied of Idolator called it an album of "striding anthems" with strong pop productions and relatable lyrics. Louise Bruton of The Irish Times shared a similar sentiment, pointing out Pink's consistent release of "relatable pop songs" throughout her career. Chuck Arnold of Entertainment Weekly commended the album's "fresh and familiar" sound and compared the theme of "brutal truths about love" with The Truth About Love.

Writing for ABC News, Allan Raible deemed Beautiful Trauma as excellent and noticed that "much of this record finds her working in ballad mode", which he considered a calculated move that highlights Pink's "significant power as a singer". Drowned in Sound's Otsa praised the album's production and wide array of influences, feeling that the singer "proves that she's both still relevant, and a vital, confident female voice". Chris Willman of Variety characterized Beautiful Trauma as "confessional pop songwriting" with "garrulous emotion", citing "Revenge" and "Whatever You Want" as highlights. Unterberger believed the album is "unmistakably heavy", referring to the "far too vivid" tracks about relationship insecurities.

Andy Gill of The Independent said that the producers' choice left "little room for originality". Likewise, Hurst found Beautiful Trauma calculated, calling it "a little too clean, too tidy, too easily resolved". However, Hurst noted the album "demonstrates its humanity" through "sharp lyrics and deeply felt vocals", praising the raw and "soul-baring" nature of "Barbies" and "But We Lost It". According to Stephen Thomas Erlewine of AllMusic, the production of Beautiful Trauma is "undergirded with genuine feeling that Pink conveys with her measured performances", but the album sounds "too controlled", resulting in a "tamer record". Sawdey was ambivalent toward the album's forgettable "sad serenades", ultimately calling it a "creatively dried out" breakup record. The Guardian's Michael Cragg gave the album a somewhat mixed review, criticizing the familiar and "nagging" sound and concluding by saying it "does the job, nothing more".

=== Accolades ===
For its year-end tabulation, People listed Beautiful Trauma at number eight on their list of Top-Ten Albums of 2017, with Jeff Nelson describing it as "unfiltered, unleashed" and "cathartic". In its year-end review of the best 20 pop albums released in 2017, Rolling Stone ranked the album at number 20, noting that "[it] successfully avoids mimicking trends". Billboard listed the album as the 13th best of 2017, with reviewer Patrick Crowley pointing out the singer's "tenacious warrior" mature attitude and her "sick sense of humor [that] is still in tact [sic]". Beautiful Trauma received nominations for Best Pop Vocal Album at the 61st Grammy Awards, and Best Pop Solo Performance for "What About Us" at the 60th ceremony. At the 2018 Billboard Music Awards, the album was nominated for the Top Selling Album award.

== Commercial performance ==
Beautiful Trauma debuted atop the US Billboard 200, with sales of 408,000 album-equivalent units, of which 384,000 were pure sales, according to Nielsen SoundScan. It became Pink's second consecutive number one album on the chart. Sales were aided by her tour audience, with the cost of the album being bundled into the purchase price of a tour ticket for US and Canadian shows. Only when a purchaser redeemed Beautiful Trauma did it count towards the album's sales. Around 225,000 copies of the first-week sales reportedly came from the album-ticket bundling. Beautiful Trauma achieved the most first-week sales for an album by a woman in the US since Beyoncé's Lemonade (2016). The album had the highest first-week traditional sales since Drake's Views (2016)—Pink's best opening week's sales yet. The following week, the album descended to number three with sales dropping by 84% to 64,000 units.

After selling 628,000 copies in the US throughout 2017, Beautiful Trauma finished as the seventh highest-selling album of the year. For the week ending May 17, 2018, the album rose 81 places from number 83 to number 2 on the Billboard 200, with sales of 139,000 units, including 135,000 copies. The sales increase was credited to the redemption of album-ticket bundling offered with the second US leg of Pink's tour. Beautiful Trauma was certified platinum in April 2018 by the RIAA for selling over a million equivalent units in the US. On the Canadian Albums Chart compiled by Billboard, it opened at number one, with 64,000 album-equivalent units. According to the Canadian SoundScan, the album had the second-highest opening week of 2017 at the time, behind Shania Twain's Now. It also became Pink's second record to top the chart, after The Truth About Love. In the week ending June 2, 2018, Beautiful Trauma topped the chart again, selling an additional 16,000 units courtesy of the ticket bundle campaign. It was certified double platinum by Music Canada (MC), which denotes 160,000 units sold there.

Beautiful Trauma debuted at the top of the UK Albums Chart, with first-week sales of 70,074 album-equivalent units. It became her second number one album in the UK, after Funhouse (2008). Beautiful Trauma had sold 372,000 copies by the end of 2017, finishing as the country's highest-selling album of the year by a non-British act and fifth highest overall. As of February 2019, the album has sold 516,087 copies in the UK and been certified platinum by the British Phonographic Industry (BPI) for sales over 300,000 units. Across Europe, Beautiful Trauma reached the summit of the charts in Austria, Belgium (Flanders), the Czech Republic, and Switzerland, and the top 10 in other countries. In France, the album debuted at number two on the Syndicat National de l'Édition Phonographique (SNEP) Albums Chart and was the best-selling album of the week, with sales of 14,853 copies. It became Pink's highest-charting album in the nation. The sales of Beautiful Trauma exceeded 100,000 units and certified platinum by the SNEP.

The album sold 50,000 copies in Australia within three days of its availability, and debuted at the top of the ARIA Albums Chart, with first-week sales of 78,040 copies—the second-largest opening week of the year after Ed Sheeran's ÷. As a result, it became Pink's fifth album to top the chart. Total sales in Australia exceeded 100,000 copies over the second week, where the album remained at number one becoming the third album of 2017 to hold the summit for more than a week, after the Trolls soundtrack and ÷. Subsequently, Beautiful Trauma spent six non-consecutive weeks at number one on the chart, becoming the longest-running number one album by a female artist in the country since Adele's 25 (2015). The album finished 2017 as the second-highest selling album of the year in the country and was certified quadruple platinum by the Australian Recording Industry Association (ARIA) for selling over 280,000 units. In New Zealand, the album also debuted at the top spot on the Official New Zealand Music Chart, holding it for three weeks in a row. It received a double platinum certification from Recorded Music NZ for shipments of over 30,000 units. According to the International Federation of the Phonographic Industry (IFPI), Beautiful Trauma was the third and eighth best-selling album of 2017 and 2018, respectively, and had sold over 3,000,000 copies worldwide by March 2019.

== Track listing ==
Standard edition
No.	Title	Writer(s)	Producer(s)	Length
1.	"Beautiful Trauma"	Alecia Moore; Jack Antonoff	Antonoff	4:10
2.	"Revenge" (featuring Eminem)	Moore; Marshall Mathers; Max Martin; Shellback	Shellback; Martin	3:46
3.	"Whatever You Want"	Moore; Martin; Shellback	Shellback; Martin	4:02
4.	"What About Us"	Moore; Johnny McDaid; Steve McCutcheon	Steve Mac	4:29
5.	"But We Lost It"	Moore; Greg Kurstin	Kurstin	3:27
6.	"Barbies"	Moore; Julia Michaels; Ross Golan; Jakob Jerlström; Ludvig Söderberg	The Struts^{[a]}; Golan^{[b]}	3:43
7.	"Where We Go"	Moore; Kurstin	Kurstin	4:27
8.	"For Now"	Moore; Michaels; Mattias Larsson; Robin Fredriksson; Martin	Mattman & Robin	3:36
9.	"Secrets"	Moore; Martin; Shellback; Oscar Holter	Shellback; Martin; Holter	3:30
10.	"Better Life"	Moore; Antonoff; Sam Dew	Antonoff	3:20
11.	"I Am Here"	Moore; Billy Mann; Christian Medice	Mann; Medice	4:06
12.	"Wild Hearts Can't Be Broken"	Moore; Michael Busbee	busbee	3:21
13.	"You Get My Love"	Moore; Tobias Jesso Jr.	Pink; Jesso Jr.	5:11
Total length:				51:08

Japanese CD bonus track
No.	Title	Writer(s)	Producer(s)	Length
14.	"White Rabbit"	Grace Slick	Andy Dodd; John Volaitis^{[b]}	2:43
Total length:				53:51

Notes

- ^{^[a]} – main and vocal production
- ^{^[b]} – vocal production

== Personnel ==
Credits were adapted from the liner notes.

=== Loactions ===
==== Recording ====
- Earthstar Creation Center (Venice, California) – recording (tracks 5, 7, 13–14 (bonus))
- Azteca Market (Glassell Park, California) – vocals (track 12)
- Landmark Studio (Nashville, Tennessee) – recording (track 14 (bonus))

==== Additional recording ====
- Willow-Valley (Göteborg, Sweden) – strings, editing (track 6)

==== Engineering ====
- Earthstar Creation Center (Venice, California) – engineering (tracks 1, 10–11)
- The Village (West Los Angeles, California) – engineering (tracks 1, 4, 10)
- Rough Customer Studio (Brooklyn, New York) – engineering (tracks 1, 10)
- MXM (Los Angeles, California) – engineering (tracks 2–3, 6, 8–9) and (Stockholm, Sweden) – engineering (tracks 2–3, 9)
- Conway (Los Angeles, California) – engineering (track 2)
- Rokstone Studios (London, England) – engineering (track 4)
- Wolf Cousins Studios (Stockholm, Sweden – engineering (track 6, 8–9)
- Turtle Sound (CT) – engineering (track 11)
- Woodshed Recording (Malibu, California) – vocals & piano engineering (track 12)
- Capitol Studios (Hollywood, California) – strings engineering (track 12)

==== Mixing and mastering ====
- MixStar Studios (Virginia Beach, Virginia)
- Azteca Market (Glassell Park, California) – mixing (track 12)
- Eastside Studio (Nashville, Tennessee) – mixing (track 12)
- The Mastering Palace (New York)
- Bernie Grundman Mastering (Hollywood, California) – mastering (track 14 (bonus))

=== Performers and musicians ===
- Pink – vocals, background vocals (all tracks)
- Eminem – vocals (track 2)
- Jack Antonoff – background vocals (track 1), drums, guitars, bass, synths (tracks 1, 10), piano (track 10)
- Charlie Bisharat – violins (track 12)
- David Bukovinszky – cello (track 6)
- busbee – piano (track 12)
- Mattias Bylund – strings (track 6)
- Robert Cani – violins (track 12)
- Mario de Leon – violins (track 12)
- Andrew Duckles – viola (track 12)
- Matt Funes – viola (track 12)
- Ross Golan – guitars (track 6)
- Missi Hale – background vocals (track 12)
- Gerardo Hilera – violins (track 12)
- Oscar Holter – keyboards (track 9)
- Mattias Johansson – violin (track 6)
- Bill Jolly – organ (track 11)
- Jolly Music Choir of Philadelphia – choir (track 11)
- Armen Ksajikian – cello (track 12)
- Greg Kurstin – piano, bass, guitar, keyboards (tracks 5, 7)
- Timothy Landauer – cello (track 12)
- Victor Lawrence – cello (track 12)
- Chris Laws – drums (track 4)
- Songa Lee – violins (track 12)
- Natalie Leggett – violins (track 12)
- Steve Mac – keyboards (track 4)
- Billy Mann – background vocals, acoustic guitars, piano (track 11)
- Max Martin – keyboards (tracks 2–3, 9)
- Mattman & Robin – bass, keyboards, guitars, percussion, piano, drums, handclaps (track 8)
- Luke Maurer – viola (track 12)
- Johnny McDaid – guitars (track 4)
- Serena McKinney – violins (track 12)
- Christian Medice – drums (track 11)
- Joel Pargman – violins (track 12)
- Alyssa Park – violins (track 12)
- Victoria Parker – violins (tracks 1, 10)
- Sarah Parkins – violins (track 12)
- Phillip A. Peterson – celli (tracks 1, 10)
- Michele Richards – violins (track 12)
- Steve Richards – cello (track 12)
- Shellback – background vocals, keyboards, guitar, bass, drums (tracks 2–3, 9)
- Evan Smith – saxophones (tracks 1, 10)
- Tereza Stanislav – violins (track 12)
- David Stone – bass (track 12)
- The Struts – keyboards, bass, percussion (track 6)
- Michael Valerio – bass (track 12)
- Josefina Vergara – violins (track 12)
- Katherine Vincent – viola (track 12)
- John Wittenberg – violins (track 12)
- Greg Morrow – drums (track 14 (bonus))
- Tony Lucido – bass (track 14 (bonus))
- Rob McNelly – guitar (track 14 (bonus))
- Andy Dodd – keyboards, guitar (track 14 (bonus))

=== Production ===
- Jack Antonoff – production, arrangement (tracks 1, 10)
- Cory Bice – engineering assistant (tracks 2–3, 9)
- Gabe Burch – engineering assistant (track 4)
- busbee – production, background vocals recording, editing, mixing (track 12)
- Mattias Bylund – string arrangement, string recording, string editing (track 6)
- David Campbell – string arrangement, string conductor (track 12)
- Steve Churchyard – string engineering (track 12)
- Dave Clauss – editing (track 12)
- John Cranfield – engineering (track 6)
- Roger Davies – executive production
- Matt Dyson – engineering assistant (track 4)
- Serban Ghenea – mixing (tracks 1–11, 13)
- Ross Golan – vocal production (track 6)
- John Hanes – engineered for mix
- Sam Holland – engineering (tracks 2–3, 8–9)
- Oscar Holter – production, programming (track 9)
- Michael Ilbert – engineering (tracks 2–3, 9)
- Tobias Jesso Jr. – production (track 13)
- Bill Jolly – gospel choir director (track 11)
- Suzie Katayama – contractor, orchestra manager (track 12)
- Greg Kurstin – production, programming (track 5, 7)
- Dave Kutch – mastering (all tracks)
- Chris Laws – engineering (track 4)
- Jeremy Lertola – engineering assistant (tracks 2–3, 9)
- Steve Mac – production (track 4)
- Billy Mann – production, arrangement, engineering (track 11)
- Christian Medice – production, arrangement, engineering, keyboard programming (track 11)
- Max Martin – production, programming (tracks 2–3, 9)
- Mattman & Robin – production, programming (track 8)
- Salvador Ojeda – engineering, piano engineering (track 12)
- Charlie Paakkari – string engineering assistant (track 12)
- Pink – executive production, production (track 13)
- Noah Passovoy – engineering (track 2)
- Dann Pursey – engineering (track 4)
- Shellback – production, programming (tracks 2–3, 9)
- Jon Sher – engineering assistant (track 2)
- Laura Sisk – engineering (tracks 1, 10)
- The Struts – production, vocal production, programming (track 6)
- Ryan Walsh – engineering assistant (track 12)
- Bryan David Willis – editing (track 12)
- Andy Dodd – production, programming, mixing (track 14 (bonus))
- John Volaitis – vocal production (track 14 (bonus))
- Patricia Sullivan – mastering (track 14 (bonus))

=== Design & management ===
- Ryan Aylsworth – photography
- Kim Bowen – wardrobe styling
- Jeri Heiden – art direction, design
- Kathy Jeung – make-up
- Pamela Neal – hair
- Nick Steinhardt – art direction, design
- Sølve Sundsbø – interior gatefold photo
- Roger Davies – management
- Bill Buntain – management
- Shady Farshadfar – management
- Lisa Garrett – management
- Irene Taylor – management
- Don Passman – legal representation
- Gene Salomon – legal representation
- Nancy Chapman – business management
- Teresa Polyak – business management

== Charts ==
=== Weekly charts ===
Chart (2017–2020)	Peak position
Australian Albums (ARIA)	1
Austrian Albums (Ö3 Austria)	1
Belgian Albums (Ultratop Flanders)	1
Belgian Albums (Ultratop Wallonia)	2
Canadian Albums (Billboard)	1
Croatian International Albums (HDU)	6
Czech Albums (ČNS IFPI)	1
Danish Albums (Hitlisten)	5
Dutch Albums (Album Top 100)	1
Finnish Albums (Suomen virallinen lista)	4
French Albums (SNEP)	2
German Albums (Offizielle Top 100)	2
Hungarian Albums (MAHASZ)	4
Irish Albums (IRMA)	1
Italian Albums (FIMI)	5
Japan Hot Albums (Billboard Japan)	14
Japanese Albums (Oricon)	28
Latvian Albums (LaIPA)	25
New Zealand Albums (RMNZ)	1
Norwegian Albums (VG-lista)	2
Polish Albums (ZPAV)	6
Portuguese Albums (AFP)	5
Scottish Albums (Official Charts)	1
Slovak Albums (ČNS IFPI)	1
South African Albums (RISA)	8
South Korean International Albums (Circle)	7
Spanish Albums (Promusicae)	4
Swedish Albums (Sverigetopplistan)	4
Swiss Albums (Schweizer Hitparade)	1
UK Albums (Official Charts)	1
US Billboard 200	1
US Indie Store Album Sales (Billboard)	5

=== Year-end charts ===
Chart (2017)	Position
Australian Albums (ARIA)	2
Austrian Albums (Ö3 Austria)	28
Belgian Albums (Ultratop Flanders)	27
Belgian Albums (Ultratop Wallonia)	63
Canadian Albums (Billboard)	15
Dutch Albums (MegaCharts)	33
French Albums (SNEP)	68
German Albums (Offizielle Top 100)	18
Hungarian Albums (MAHASZ)	56
New Zealand Albums (RMNZ)	3
Swiss Albums (Schweizer Hitparade)	18
UK Albums (OCC)	5
US Billboard 200	46
Worldwide Albums (IFPI)	3

Chart (2018)	Position
Australian Albums (ARIA)	9
Belgian Albums (Ultratop Flanders)	46
Belgian Albums (Ultratop Wallonia)	142
Canadian Albums (Billboard)	9
Dutch Albums (MegaCharts)	60
French Albums (SNEP)	79
German Albums (Offizielle Top 100)	68
Irish Albums (IRMA)	28
New Zealand Albums (RMNZ)	7
Swiss Albums (Schweizer Hitparade)	23
UK Albums (OCC)	34
US Billboard 200	36

Chart (2019)	Position
Australian Albums (ARIA)	93
Belgian Albums (Ultratop Flanders)	180

=== Decade-end charts ===
Chart (2010–2019)	Position
Australian Albums (ARIA)	19

== Certifications ==
Certifications and sales for Beautiful Trauma
Region	Certification	Certified units/sales
Australia (ARIA)	4× Platinum	280,000^{^}
Austria (IFPI Austria)	Gold	7,500^{‡}
Brazil (Pro-Música Brasil)	Gold	20,000^{‡}
Canada (Music Canada)	3× Platinum	240,000^{‡}
Denmark (IFPI Danmark)	Gold	10,000^{‡}
France (SNEP)	Platinum	100,000^{‡}
Germany (BVMI)	Platinum	200,000^{‡}
Netherlands (NVPI)	Platinum	40,000^{‡}
New Zealand (RMNZ)	4× Platinum	60,000^{‡}
Norway (IFPI Norway)	Platinum	20,000^{‡}
Poland (ZPAV)	Platinum	20,000^{‡}
Sweden (GLF)	Gold	15,000^{‡}
Switzerland (IFPI Switzerland)	Platinum	20,000^{‡}
United Kingdom (BPI)	2× Platinum	600,000^{‡}
United States (RIAA)	Platinum	1,000,000^{‡}
Summaries
Worldwide	—	3,000,000
^{^} Shipments figures based on certification alone.^{‡} Sales+streaming figures based on certification alone.

== Release history ==
List of regions, release dates, showing formats, label, editions and references
Region	Date	Format(s)	Label	Editions	Ref.
Various	October 13, 2017	CD; digital download; streaming; vinyl	RCA	Explicit; clean	
