= Whatever You Want (Pink song) =

Single by Pink

from the album Beautiful Trauma
- Released: June 4, 2018
- Studio: MXM Studios (Los Angeles, California); MXM Studios (Stockholm, Sweden)
- Length: 4:03
- Label: RCA
- Songwriters: Alecia Moore; Max Martin; Shellback
- Producers: Max Martin; Shellback

Pink singles chronology
"Beautiful Trauma" (2017)	"Whatever You Want" (2018)	"Secrets" (2018)

Music video
- "Whatever You Want" on YouTube

"Whatever You Want" is a song recorded by American singer Pink from her seventh studio album Beautiful Trauma. Pink co-wrote the song with its producers, Max Martin and Shellback. The song impacted hot adult contemporary radio on June 4, 2018, as the third single from the album. The song reached the top 40 in Slovakia.

== Release ==
On October 5, 2017, "Whatever You Want" was released as the second promotional single from the album with the first being the album's title track, which then became the album's second official single. The song debuted alongside the announcement of Beautiful Trauma World Tour and a documentary on Apple Music.

== Music video ==
The music video for the song was premiered on Apple Music on March 1, 2018. It was released exclusively for Apple Music users and then released to the public the following day. The music video was directed and edited by Brad Comfort. It contains clips of Pink preparing for her Beautiful Trauma World Tour, clips from her performance at Super Bowl LII, and clips from her at the 2017 MTV Video Music Awards.

== Critical reception ==
Ross McNeilage of MTV News called it "a classic Pink-fighting-for-love song" and "a gorgeous acoustic midtempo built with stunning harmonies that elevate the song to something much bigger than its laidback production". Madeline Roth of the same publication added that it is an "uplifting power ballad". Anna Gaca of Spin deemed the song "a middle-of-the-road ballad about holding out in a relationship that feels like a sinking ship". Elias Leight of Rolling Stone regarded the song as "a celebration of romantic resilience", and felt "strings swell grandly and ringing guitars signal renewed commitment". Mike Nied of Idolator described the song as "more of the punchy determination that we have come to expect from her music and is shaping up to be a nice addition to her discography".

== Track listing ==
Remixes EP

1. "Whatever You Want" (Faux Tales Remix) – 3:22
2. "Whatever You Want" (FTampa Remix) – 3:57
3. "Whatever You Want" (Embody Remix) – 3:53

== Charts ==
=== Weekly charts ===
Weekly chart performance for "Whatever You Want"
Chart (2017–2018)	Peak position
Australia (ARIA)	44
Belgium (Ultratip Bubbling Under Flanders)	6
Belgium (Ultratip Bubbling Under Wallonia)	47
Canada AC (Billboard)	18
Canada Digital Song Sales (Billboard)	39
Canada Hot AC (Billboard)	17
Croatia (HRT)	58
France Downloads (SNEP)	58
Hungary (Rádiós Top 40)	35
New Zealand Heatseekers (RMNZ)	4
Slovakia Airplay (ČNS IFPI)	12
Switzerland (Schweizer Hitparade)	79
US Adult Contemporary (Billboard)	22
US Adult Pop Airplay (Billboard)	11

=== Year-end charts ===
Year-end chart performance for "Whatever You Want"
Chart (2018)	Position
Iceland (Plötutíóindi)	99
US Adult Top 40 (Billboard)	36

== Certifications ==
Certifications for "Whatever You Want"
Region	Certification	Certified units/sales
Australia (ARIA)	Gold	35,000^{‡}
New Zealand (RMNZ)	Gold	15,000^{‡}
^{‡} Sales+streaming figures based on certification alone.

== Release history ==
Region	Date	Format	Version	Label	Ref.
United States	October 5, 2017 (Note: Release as a promotional single.)	Digital download	Original	RCA	
Australia	March 2, 2018	Contemporary hit radio	Original	Universal Music Australia	
United States	June 4, 2018	Hot adult contemporary	Original	RCA Records	
Worldwide	June 22, 2018	Digital download	Remixes EP	RCA Records	
