= Revenge (Pink song) =

Promotional single by Pink featuring Eminem

from the album Beautiful Trauma
- Released: October 13, 2017
- Studio: MXM Studios (Los Angeles, CA); MXM Studios (Stockholm, Sweden); Conway Recording Studios (Los Angeles, CA)
- Length: 3:46
- Label: RCA
- Songwriters: Alecia Moore; Marshall Mathers; Max Martin; Shellback
- Producers: Max Martin; Shellback

"Revenge" is a song by American singer and songwriter Pink featuring American rapper Eminem. It was written by the artists alongside Max Martin and Shellback. The song was announced to be released through RCA Records in late 2017 as the second single from Pink's seventh studio album, Beautiful Trauma (2017); however, the title track was released on November 21, instead.

== Music video ==
The official unfinished music video surfaced on Vimeo on May 23, 2019, but only gained notoriety in July 2020, being removed shortly thereafter from the platform.

== Charts ==
Chart (2017)	Peak position
Australia (ARIA)	21
Austria (Ö3 Austria Top 40)	52
Canada Hot 100 (Billboard)	63
Czech Republic Singles Digital (ČNS IFPI)	59
Germany (GfK)	84
Hungary (Single Top 40)	34
Ireland (IRMA)	55
Netherlands (Dutch Top 40)	24
New Zealand (Recorded Music NZ)	30
Scotland Singles (OCC)	29
Slovakia Singles Digital (ČNS IFPI)	61
Sweden (Sverigetopplistan)	79
Switzerland (Schweizer Hitparade)	40
UK Singles (OCC)	33
US Bubbling Under Hot 100 (Billboard)	1

== Certifications ==
Region	Certification	Certified units/sales
Australia (ARIA)	Platinum	70,000^{‡}
Canada (Music Canada)	Gold	40,000^{‡}
New Zealand (RMNZ)	Platinum	30,000^{‡}
United Kingdom (BPI)	Silver	200,000^{‡}
^{‡} Sales+streaming figures based on certification alone.
