= What About Us (Pink song) =

2017 single by Pink

Single by Pink

from the album Beautiful Trauma
- Released: August 10, 2017
- Studio: Rokstone Studios (London); The Village Studios (Los Angeles)
- Genre: EDM; electropop
- Length: 4:30
- Label: RCA
- Songwriters: Pink; Johnny McDaid; Steve Mac
- Producer: Steve Mac

Pink singles chronology
"Waterfall" (2017)	"What About Us" (2017)	"Beautiful Trauma" (2017)

Music video
- "What About Us" on YouTube

"What About Us" is a song recorded by the American singer-songwriter Pink for her seventh studio album Beautiful Trauma (2017). RCA Records released the song for digital download and streaming on August 10, 2017, as the album's lead single. The song, which was written by Pink, Johnny McDaid, and its producer Steve Mac, is an electronic dance music (EDM) track with upbeat dance production that blends repetitive chords, synthesizers, and drum machine beats with an electropop rhythm. Pink, who was inspired by the politics of the time, composed it as a political protest song with poetic and inclusive lyrics. The song's lyrics explore Pink's belief that the United States' government had failed its people and sent a message about those who feel unheard or forgotten.

Music critics gave "What About Us" mostly positive reviews; many of them commended the production and Pink's vocal performance while others appreciated the song's political message and the anthemic nature of the composition. It peaked at number 13 on the US Billboard Hot 100 and gave Pink her record-breaking ninth number-one song on the Adult Pop Songs chart, surpassing Katy Perry as the soloist with the most chart-topping songs on the chart. The song also reached number one on the national charts of eight countries, including Australia, Poland and Switzerland, and peaked within the top 10 in 12 other territories, including Canada and the United Kingdom. It is certified Diamond in France, eight-times Platinum in Australia, five-times Platinum in Canada, and Platinum or higher in fourteen additional countries. "What About Us" was nominated for Best Pop Solo Performance at the 60th Annual Grammy Awards.

An accompanying music video for "What About Us" was directed by Georgia Hudson and released on August 16, 2017. It depicts Pink and members of minority groups performing several choreographed routines in an abandoned city while being chased by searchlights from hovering helicopters. The video received positive reviews from critics, who praised the choreography and the representation of oppressed groups, as well as the song's political theme. To promote the song, Pink performed it live at the 2017 MTV Video Music Awards, on Saturday Night Live, and on The Ellen DeGeneres Show, among other televised appearances, as well as her Beautiful Trauma World Tour (2018–2019). The song has been covered several times during live performances by other artists, including Kelly Clarkson and Liam Payne.

== Writing and inspiration ==
"[Pink] is quite fearless. It was inspiring to work with someone who would risk saying the things that she says, the way she says them, that's truly an artist."

— Johnny McDaid on working with Pink on "What About Us"

After conducting The Truth About Love Tour (2013–2014) in support of her sixth studio album The Truth About Love (2012), Pink took a nearly-four-year hiatus to focus on her personal life and find inspiration. During the hiatus, she concentrated on her family and living "a normal life", which influenced her music. Fifty songs were composed throughout the development of Beautiful Trauma, including "What About Us".

"What About Us" was written by Pink, Johnny McDaid and Steve Mac, and was produced by Mac. In an interview with Vulture, Pink talked about the experience of writing the song, stating, "it was just another day I was angry about what's happening in the world". The singer decided to have discussions and anecdotes with McDaid to develop ideas for the album's songs; McDaid said Pink had "so much to say" and expressed herself "really profoundly". "What About Us" was written and recorded during the session; according to Pink, "those are those kinds of songs where it just falls out of you, that's why I think you're just a vessel when you're being creative".

When asked about the creation of the song, McDaid said:

From my perspective the creation of it is about looking into yourself, interacting. It's like alchemy, you know, you interact with the person there in the room and ... these things, these ideas come out and what the ideas are for [Pink] are probably different to even the person hearing it. And that's the beauty of her, she really allows people to receive her music the way they do.

== Composition and lyrical interpretation ==
"What About Us" is an upbeat EDM song, with a length of four minutes and twenty-nine seconds. The synthesizer-heavy production of the song makes use of "pounding" drums, "glistening" keyboards, and a "pulsating" dance beat. It draws influences from four on the floor, club, and electronic music. According to the sheet music published by Sony/ATV Music Publishing at Musicnotes.com, "What About Us" is set in the time signature of common time. This song is composed in the key of A♭ major with a moderate tempo of 114 beats per minute. It follows a chord progression of Fm–D♭–A♭ with Pink's vocals spanning one and a half octaves, going from A♭_{3} to E♭_{5}.

Music journalists noted "What About Us" starts as a ballad with piano and acoustic arrangements, and appears at first to be about a relationship. Mike Nied of Idolator described the song as "part break-up anthem, part political call to arms". Gil Kaufman of Billboard shared a similar sentiment, saying the lyrics can be interpreted as "commenting on the state of the world, or the state of the heart". Pink described the song as a political protest song that provides social commentary on her belief the US government had failed people. According to Pink, the "more sophisticated" nature of the song stems from the poetic and inclusive lyrics, which send a message about people around the world who feel ignored or forgotten. The track also took inspiration from the 2016 United States presidential election and the current political state.

In an interview with Billboard, McDaid said "What About Us" "is a question ... not an instruction", and the unclear question is "essential to its brilliance". According to him, Mac's technique of using repetitive chords can be compared with a heartbeat or a mantra, giving the song a sense of "this incredible, epic celebration" and unity. In "What About Us", Pink asks urgent questions during the "insistent" and "soaring" chorus, singing, "What about us?/ What about all the times you said you had the answers?/ What about us?/ What about all the broken happy ever afters?". Ross McNeilage of MTV and Justin Moran of Out both noted political undertones behind the lyrics; McNeilage said they can "definitely be taken as an anthem of resistance to the current state of political affairs" while Moran said the questions are addressed to "a dishonest political leader".

== Release and artwork ==
Prior to the single's release in July 2017, Pink teased it on her social media page using a recording made on the set of the music video . Pink officially announced the release date of "What About Us" on July 24, 2017, posting a picture on her social media. The image shows the singer, seen from behind, standing in front of a city landscape and a police car. Pink later unveiled the single's artwork, which is a black-and-white picture that shows her in a group with "beautifully diverse" models. The picture was photographed by Ryan Aylsworth.

"What About Us" was released for digital download and streaming on August 10, 2017, by RCA Records as the lead single from Beautiful Trauma, along with the pre-order of the album. An accompanying lyric video was uploaded to Pink's YouTube channel simultaneously with the song's release. RCA Records also released the track to Italian contemporary hit radio stations on the same day. A CD single was released in Germany on August 18, 2017, through Sony Music. On September 15, 2017, a remix EP with four versions of "What About Us" was released for digital download and streaming in several countries. On October 20 of the same year, a remix of the song by Dutch DJ Tiësto was made available for digital download.

== Critical reception ==
"What About Us" was met with mostly positive reviews from music critics. Althea Legaspi of Rolling Stone considered it an "emotional dance floor anthem". Writing for The New York Times, Caryn Ganz commended the track and highlighted Pink's vocals, saying, "she lets the emotion in her tremendous voice do the heavy lifting, shifting from wonder to frustration to anger". Vulture writer Dee Lockett was impressed by the song's upbeat production in contrast with the lyrics about "capturing such a desperate mood". Louise Bruton from The Irish Times said the song's message addresses "the marginalised and the mistreated".

While reviewing Beautiful Trauma, Mike Nied of Idolator praised "What About Us" for being an "insightful statement" and lauded the "effortlessly cool" production. Mike Wass, also from Idolator, favored the track's blending of acoustic and electronic elements and praised Pink for being able to create a political song "without being obnoxious". Lewis Corner of Gay Times called the track "a scaling anthem ready for an arena show". Labeling "What About Us" an "empowering ballad", Raisa Bruner from Time said the song marks a departure from Pink's "bombastic tendencies" and showcases "the depth of [Pink's] feelings" as well as her powerful voice. Allison Bowsher of Much said the song is "her most politically and socially conscious song to date".

In his review of Beautiful Trauma for Variety, Chris Willman labeled the song a "sad dance-floor thumper" with beseeching, "soul-searching" lyrics. Hilary Hughes of MTV News praised the song's production, stating it sounds "steady, dance floor-ready", and positively compared the song to Coldplay's "A Sky Full of Stars" (2015). Andrew Unterberger from Billboard also noted similarities between the "spectral EDM foray" of "What About Us" and "A Sky Full of Stars". According to Unterberger, the "anthemic" song also has themes of "hurt, anger and fear". Deeming the track as a "political anthem", Moran complimented the powerful message of "honest desperation and untouchable strength". In his review of the album, Slant Magazine's Josh Hurst called the song "spacy [and] atmospheric".

For Lauren Moraski from HuffPost, "What About Us" was a "strong pop song that showcases Pink's vocal chops". Chris Gerard from the Washington Blade described it as a "yearning, emotional anthem" and noted Pink's "sincere and deeply felt" vocals, saying the song is "among the finest singles" of her career. ABC News critic Allan Raible named "What About Us" one of the standout tracks from Beautiful Trauma and wrote Pink's vocal performance gives it a "surprisingly organic heft". In a negative review, The Guardian's Gavin Haynes labeled the song as "the worst sort of Katy Perry anthemics about how we're all just 'rockets pointed up at the stars' ". "What About Us" received a Grammy nomination for Best Pop Solo Performance at the 60th Annual ceremony.

== Commercial performance ==
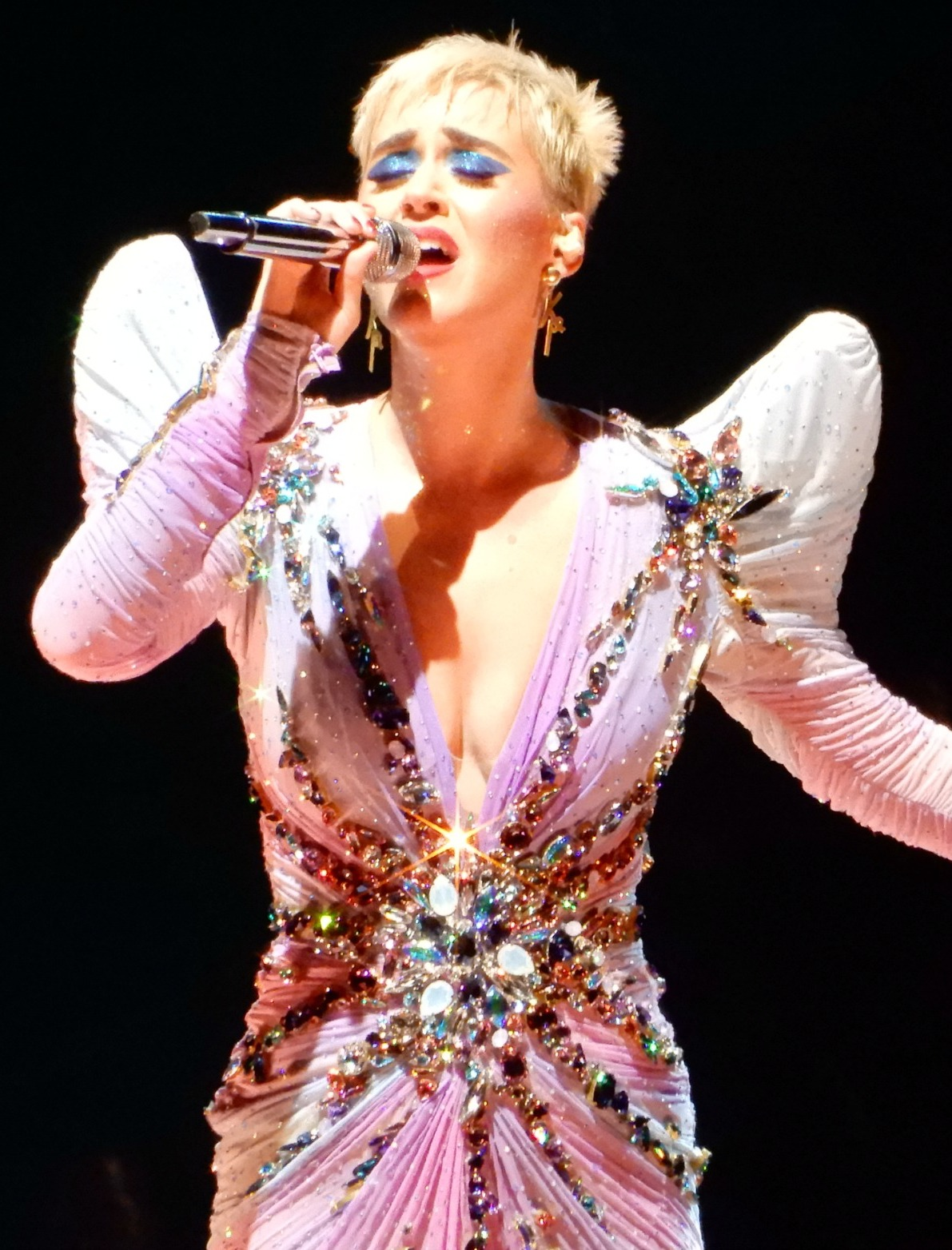
"What About Us" became Pink's ninth song to reach the summit of the Adult Pop Songs chart in the US, breaking her tie with Katy Perry (pictured) and making her the solo artist with the most number one songs on the chart.

In the US, "What About Us" debuted at number 82 on the Billboard Hot 100 for the week ending August 26, 2017, although it was released during the last day of the tracking week. According to Nielsen SoundScan, the song sold 16,000 copies in its first day of release, entering the US Digital Songs chart at number 30. After its first full week of tracking, "What About Us" peaked at number three on the chart and rose to number 29 on the Hot 100, selling 55,000 copies and becoming Pink's 23rd top 40 song on the chart. The track later peaked at number 13 on the Hot 100 following the release of Beautiful Trauma. "What About Us" debuted on the US Radio Songs chart at number 41 with 30 million audience impressions and peaked at number three on the chart. It also peaked at number 10 on the Mainstream Top 40 chart for the week ending November 11, 2017.

"What About Us" became Pink's ninth song to reach number one on the US Adult Pop Songs chart, breaking her tie with Katy Perry and giving Pink the distinction of being the solo artist with the most chart-topping songs, as well as placing her second on the list of artists with the most number one singles on the chart behind Maroon 5. It also topped the Adult Contemporary chart, becoming Pink's fourth number-one single on the chart. "What About Us" also peaked at number one on the US Dance Club Songs chart on October 28, 2017, aided by remixes from Cash Cash, Barry Harris, Pink Panda and Madison Mars, among others. In October 2017, Nielsen SoundScan reported the song had sold 290,226 copies in the US. It was later certified platinum by the Recording Industry Association of America (RIAA) for selling 1,000,000 certified units in the country. In Canada, the song peaked at number six on the Canadian Hot 100 and ultimately received a triple platinum certification from Music Canada (MC) for accumulating 320,000 equivalent sales units.

"What About Us" entered the UK Singles Chart at number 83 for the issue date of August 17, 2017, and rose to number 5 the following week, selling 22,816 units and becoming Pink's 19th top 10 song in the United Kingdom. The track peaked at number three in the fourth week, selling 33,584 units and spending three non-consecutive weeks at its peak position. The song was later certified triple platinum by the British Phonographic Industry (BPI) for accumulating sales of 1,800,000 units in the UK. "What About Us" also experienced commercial success in mainland Europe, topping the charts in eight countries, including Poland and Switzerland. The song reached the top 10 in 12 other countries, including Austria, Hungary, Czech Republic, Portugal, Spain, Germany, and Italy. In France, the song reached the top twenty, at number 19, becoming P!nk's eleventh top twenty, and spent 32 weeks on the Singles Chart. Then, it was certified diamond by the Syndicat National de l'Édition Phonographique (SNEP) for accumulating 333,333 equivalent sales units in France. The song equally reached the top twenty in Sweden and Norway, at number 15 and number 20. It was certified Platinum in Norway.

In Australia, "What About Us" debuted at number one on the ARIA Singles Chart, where it remained for two consecutive weeks as Pink's ninth number-one single in Australia. The song has since been certified seven-times platinum by the Australian Recording Industry Association (ARIA), signifying sales of 490,000 equivalent units in Australia. The song peaked at number nine on the New Zealand Top 40 Singles chart on the report dated October 23, 2017. It was later awarded a platinum certification by Recorded Music NZ (RMNZ) for sales of over 30,000 equivalent units in the country.

== Music video ==
=== Background and development ===
The music video for "What About Us" was directed by Georgia Hudson and produced by Sacha Smith. In an interview with Promo News, Hudson said she wanted to record an "emotional dance film". The video includes several dance routines that were choreographed by Nick Florez and RJ Durell, who are known collectively as the GoldenBoyz. According to Hudson, this allowed the dancers to express "their frustration and feeling towards the current political climate", demonstrating a sense of "expression [and] community".

Kim Bowen and Elise Navidad chose outfits inspired by the UK art school scene, which were described as a fusion of "grunge with folk, or punk with tie-dye and sportswear". Explaining the dance scene involving two men, Hudson said she had the idea "to illustrate a condensed version of the course of a relationship". The scene grows in intensity and is set in a space for them to behave "animalistic, ... raw and unexpected". The final desert dance "moved [Pink] to tears" and was inspired by a dream she had. Steve Annis used a helicopter as a top light for the video, which operated with 40-80mm zoom lenses. Hudson called the use of the helicopter "a totally unique experience". The music video was released on August 16, 2017.

=== Synopsis ===
A gay couple embracing and performing a contemporary dance in an abandoned city. Director Georgia Hudson specified that the scene illustrates the evolution and intensity of a relationship.

The main theme of the music video is a lost generation of abandoned and unheard people uniting through dance, symbolizing love. The video commences with a series of interspersed scenes that show an urban area, a helicopter police chase, two men hugging, a group of social outcasts consoling each other and Pink staring into the camera while her hair is shaved off. The video's soundtrack includes samples of people protesting racism and police brutality, as well as political speeches, including the keynote speech and introducing US presidential candidate Donald Trump at the 2016 Republican National Convention. Christie's speech disappears as a man says: "We are going to reject hate! We are going to reject racism!".

As the song opens, Pink, with a diverse group of people, dances in a parking lot surrounded by abandoned police cars with flashing lights. When the chorus begins, the video cuts to a scene in which Pink and minority groups, including immigrants and same-sex couples, stare into the spotlight of a helicopter hovering overhead; they are the only population of the bleak, abandoned city in which the video is set. In the next scene, a gay couple fight and embrace while a helicopter hovers overhead with a searchlight. Interspersed scenes show Pink singing and wearing a black hoodie with gold sequin pants - and her hair in a triple ponytail. Pink and her dancers then dance in a diner. Pink, wearing a silver jacket, then stands on top of a car. At the end of the video, Pink and her dancers perform in the desert. During the final scene, a man's voice says: "Now it's the time to protect our community".

=== Critical reception ===
The music video was met with positive reviews from critics. Eric King of Entertainment Weekly said the video emphasizes the song's political message and praised the "powerful same-sex dance routine", saying, "It's an emotive watch, and one that makes a clear statement about life for minorities in Trump's America". Rolling Stone writer Daniel Kreps called the video "stirring" and likening the storyline and concept to "those whose rights are in danger in Trump's America: immigrants, same-sex couples, minorities and more". Lyndsey Havens from Billboard described the video as "wild" and "heavy on hard-hitting dance moves". Taylor Henderson of Pride said Pink's consistently releases music videos that "tell stories with choreography" and said the video is "a timely and incredible addition to Pink's catalogue of hits". Wass called the video "a call for acceptance and togetherness", and said it is "[her] most choreography-heavy video in years". Maeve McDermott of USA Today said the video gives a different meaning to the song and can be seen as "a message to those in power from the people they left behind". McNeilage praised the video for being a political "direct protest" while writing "the two male dancers' beautiful performances is a clear highlight". Bowsher likened the contemporary dance theme of the "What About Us" music video with the video for Pink's 2012 single "Try". She commended the use of dance as "an effort to connect people on a different level" and a way to express fear, sadness, and despair.

== Live performances ==
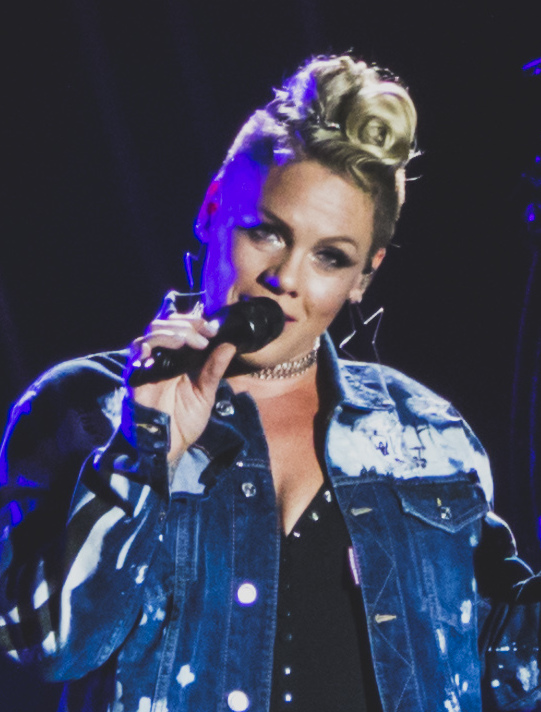
Pink performing "What About Us" during the 2017 V Festival

Pink performed "What About Us" live for the first time at Waldbühne in Berlin, Germany, on August 11, 2017. During Pink's headline set at the V Festival that year, she performed the song with older material. At the 2017 MTV Video Music Awards, Pink was presented with the Michael Jackson Video Vanguard Award and sang the song as part of a greatest-hits medley. Her performance was met with positive reviews by critics. Hughes said the performance included "some of the most breathtaking choreography of the night" while Nicholas Hautman of Us Weekly praised the "impressive dance break" and the singer's "impeccable vocals".

Pink delivered two performances of "What About Us" on The Ellen DeGeneres Show on September 6, 2017, and the show's final episode on May 26, 2022, respectively. Two days later, Pink performed the song for BBC Radio 1's Live Lounge. She was a main headliner at the 2017 Kaaboo Del Mar Festival, where her setlist included a performance of "What About Us". On September 22 of that year, Pink performed a medley of "Raise Your Glass", "What About Us", "Funhouse", "Just Like Fire", and "So What" at the iHeartRadio Music Festival.

On Saturday Night Live on October 14, 2017, Pink performed "What About Us" wearing a brown tweed vest, a jacket, and large gold hoop earrings. Two days later, the singer performed the song on Good Morning America. On October 22, 2017, she performed the song during CBS Radio's "We Can Survive" benefit concert for breast cancer awareness at the Hollywood Bowl. On November 1, 2017, Pink appeared on Jimmy Kimmel Live! and sang "What About Us". She appeared on The Late Late Show with James Corden in the Carpool Karaoke segment on November 15 of that year, singing "What About Us" along with older songs.

In the UK, Pink promoted Beautiful Trauma by performing "What About Us" on The Graham Norton Show on December 1, 2017. She performed the song live on the finale of the 14th series of The X Factor UK two days later. On December 5, 2017, Pink traveled to France and performed a concert at the Élysée Montmartre in Paris as part of the NRJ Music Tour, with her setlist including "What About Us". The singer later appeared on French television show Quotidien, where she was interviewed and performed "What About Us". On December 10, 2017, Pink performed the song on The Voice of Germany. The track was also performed as part of the Beautiful Trauma World Tour (2018–2019), where it was preceded by a video interlude that features Pink talking about the Me Too movement, gay marriage, and inclusion. On August 22, 2024, Pink sang the song at the Democratic National Convention, accompanied by her daughter, Willow Sage Hart. Pink performed the "What About Us" on January 30, 2025, at Kia Forum in Inglewood, California for FireAid to help with relief efforts for the January 2025 Southern California wildfires.

== Cover versions ==
Dutch singer Davina Michelle covered "What About Us" in August 2017. After watching the performance as part of Glamour's "You Sang My Song" video series, Pink was impressed and praised her cover, saying, "That is better than I will ever sound". On November 3, 2017, English singer Liam Payne performed a stripped-down version of "What About Us" as part of the BBC's music television series Sounds Like Friday Night; Kesha Watson of Much praised his cover, saying, "Payne handled himself very well, adding his own flare and pulling it off perfectly". In January 2018, Spanish singer Miriam Rodríguez covered the song for the ninth series of television music competition series Operación Triunfo. In November 2019, American singer Kelly Clarkson covered "What About Us" on her talk show The Kelly Clarkson Show; as part of the "Kellyoke" segment. Meredith Kile‍ of Entertainment Tonight said Clarkson's voice "fits perfectly" into a version of the song and that her performance "[reminded] us to keep fighting for those happy ever afters".

== Track listings ==
Digital download
No.	Title	Length
1.	"What About Us"	4:29

CD single
No.	Title	Length
1.	"What About Us" (main version)	4:29
2.	"What About Us" (instrumental)	4:29

Digital download (The Remixes EP)
No.	Title	Length
1.	"What About Us" (Cash Cash Remix)	3:53
2.	"What About Us" (Madison Mars Remix)	3:33
3.	"What About Us" (Pink Panda Remix)	3:19
4.	"What About Us" (Barry Harris Remix)	3:41

Digital download (Tiësto's AFTR:HRS Remix)
No.	Title	Length
1.	"What About Us" (Tiësto's AFTR:HRS Remix)	4:02

== Credits and personnel ==
Management

- Published by EMI Blackwood Music, Inc./P!nk Inside Publishing (BMI), Spirit B-Unique Polar Patrol Songs obo Spirit B-Unique Polar Patrol (BMI) (adm. by Kobalt Music Ltd.), Rokstone Music Limited (PRS) under exclusive to Universal Music Publishing Limited (ASCAP)
- Engineered at The Village Studios, Los Angeles, CA & Rokstone Studios, London
- Mixed at MixStar Studios, Virginia Beach, VA

Personnel

- Pink – songwriter, primary vocals
- Johnny McDaid – songwriter, guitars
- Steve Mac – songwriter, producer, keyboards
- Chris Laws – drums, engineering
- Dann Pursey – engineering
- Gabe Burch – engineering assistant
- Matt Dyson – engineering assistant
- Serban Ghenea – mixing
- John Hanes – engineered for mix

Credits adapted from the liner notes of "What About Us".

== Charts ==
=== Weekly charts ===
Weekly chart performance
Chart (2017–2018)	Peak position
Australia (ARIA)	1
Austria (Ö3 Austria Top 40)	3
Belarus Airplay (Eurofest)	32
Belgium (Ultratop 50 Flanders)	2
Belgium (Ultratop 50 Wallonia)	2
Brazil (Brasil Hot 100 Airplay)	86
Canada Hot 100 (Billboard)	6
Canada AC (Billboard)	1
Canada CHR/Top 40 (Billboard)	2
Canada Hot AC (Billboard)	1
CIS Airplay (TopHit)	48
Colombia (National-Report)	45
Croatia International Airplay (Top lista)	2
Czech Republic Singles Digital (ČNS IFPI)	6
Denmark (Tracklisten)	21
Ecuador (National-Report)	7
Euro Digital Songs (Billboard)	1
Finland Airplay (Radiosoittolista)	4
France (SNEP)	19
France Airplay (SNEP)	1
Germany (GfK)	3
Germany Airplay (BVMI)	1
Hungary (Rádiós Top 40)	2
Hungary (Single Top 40)	3
Hungary (Stream Top 40)	7
Iceland (Tónlistinn)	6
Ireland (IRMA)	5
Italy (FIMI)	5
Japan Hot 100 (Billboard)	45
Latvia Streaming (LaIPA)	44
Lebanon (Lebanese Top 20)	2
Luxembourg Digital (Billboard)	1
Mexico (Billboard Ingles Airplay)	1
Netherlands (Dutch Top 40)	1
Netherlands (Single Top 100)	9
New Zealand (Recorded Music NZ)	9
Norway (VG-lista)	20
Philippines (Philippine Hot 100)	61
Poland Airplay (ZPAV)	1
Portugal (AFP)	8
Romania (Airplay 100)	2
Scottish Singles Sales (Official Charts)	1
Slovakia Airplay (ČNS IFPI)	1
Slovakia Singles Digital (ČNS IFPI)	10
Slovenia Airplay (SloTop50)	1
Spain (Promusicae)	55
Sweden (Sverigetopplistan)	15
Switzerland (Schweizer Hitparade)	1
UK Singles (Official Charts)	3
Ukraine Airplay (TopHit)	3
US Billboard Hot 100	13
US Adult Contemporary (Billboard)	1
US Adult Pop Airplay (Billboard)	1
US Dance Club Songs (Billboard)	1
US Pop Airplay (Billboard)	10
Venezuela (National-Report)	66

=== Monthly charts ===
Monthly chart performance
Chart (2017–2018)	Peak position
Slovenia Airplay (SloTop50)	1
Ukraine Airplay (Tophit)	4

=== Year-end charts ===
Annual chart rankings
Chart (2017)	Position
Australia (ARIA)	33
Austria (Ö3 Austria Top 40)	40
Belgium (Ultratop Flanders)	29
Belgium (Ultratop Wallonia)	45
Canada (Canadian Hot 100)	59
Croatia International Airplay (HRT)	70
France (SNEP)	121
Germany (Official German Charts)	39
Hungary (Rádiós Top 40)	42
Hungary (Single Top 40)	21
Hungary (Stream Top 40)	62
Iceland (Tónlistinn)	50
Italy (FIMI)	87
Latvia Airplay (LaIPA)	98
Netherlands (Dutch Top 40)	9
Netherlands (Single Top 100)	62
Poland (ZPAV)	45
Romania (Airplay 100)	66
Slovenia (SloTop50)	30
Spain Airplay (PROMUSICAE)	28
Switzerland (Schweizer Hitparade)	25
UK Singles (Official Charts Company)	54
US Billboard Hot 100	84
US Adult Contemporary (Billboard)	17
US Adult Top 40 (Billboard)	23
US Dance Club Songs (Billboard)	22
US Mainstream Top 40 (Billboard)	47
US Radio Songs (Billboard)	48

Chart (2018)	Position
Belgium (Ultratop Flanders)	77
Belgium (Ultratop Wallonia)	95
CIS (Tophit)	116
Croatia International Airplay (HRT)	11
Hungary (Rádiós Top 40)	17
Iceland (Plötutíóindi)	57
Netherlands Airplay (Airplay Top 40)	64
Romania (Airplay 100)	45
Slovenia (SloTop50)	29
Switzerland (Schweizer Hitparade)	88
Ukraine Airplay (Tophit)	24
US Adult Contemporary (Billboard)	3
US Adult Top 40 (Billboard)	24

== Certifications ==
Certifications and sales for "What About Us"
Region	Certification	Certified units/sales
Australia (ARIA)	8× Platinum	560,000^{‡}
Austria (IFPI Austria)	Gold	15,000^{‡}
Belgium (BRMA)	Platinum	20,000^{‡}
Brazil (Pro-Música Brasil)	3× Platinum	120,000^{‡}
Canada (Music Canada)	5× Platinum	400,000^{‡}
Denmark (IFPI Danmark)	Platinum	90,000^{‡}
France (SNEP)	Diamond	333,333^{‡}
Germany (BVMI)	3× Gold	600,000^{‡}
Italy (FIMI)	2× Platinum	100,000^{‡}
Mexico (AMPROFON)	Platinum	60,000^{‡}
New Zealand (RMNZ)	5× Platinum	150,000^{‡}
Norway (IFPI Norway)	Platinum	60,000^{‡}
Poland (ZPAV)	3× Platinum	60,000^{‡}
Portugal (AFP)	Gold	5,000^{‡}
Spain (Promusicae)	Platinum	60,000^{‡}
Switzerland (IFPI Switzerland)	3× Platinum	60,000^{‡}
United Kingdom (BPI)	3× Platinum	1,800,000^{‡}
United States (RIAA)	Platinum	1,000,000^{‡}
Streaming
Sweden (GLF)	2× Platinum	16,000,000^{†}
^{‡} Sales+streaming figures based on certification alone.^{†} Streaming-only figures based on certification alone.

== Release history ==
Release dates and formats for "What About Us"
Region	Date	Format(s)	Version	Label	Ref.
Various	August 10, 2017	Digital download; streaming	Original	RCA	
Italy	August 10, 2017	Contemporary hit radio	Original	Sony	
United Kingdom	August 12, 2017	Contemporary hit radio	Original	RCA	
Germany	August 18, 2017	CD single	Original	Sony	
Various	September 15, 2017	Digital download	The Remixes EP	RCA	
Various	October 20, 2017	Digital download	Tiësto's AFTR:HRS remix	RCA	

== See also ==
- List of number-one singles of 2017 (Australia)
- List of number-one songs of the 2010s (Czech Republic)
- List of number-one singles of 2017 (Poland)
- List of number-one singles of 2017 (Slovenia)
- List of number-one hits of 2017 (Switzerland)
- List of number-one dance singles of 2017 (U.S.)
- List of Adult Top 40 number-one songs of the 2010s
- List of Billboard Adult Contemporary number ones of 2018
