= Secrets (Pink song) =

Single by Pink

from the album Beautiful Trauma
- Released: August 2, 2018
- Studio: MXM Studios (Los Angeles, California); MXM Studios (Stockholm, Sweden); Wolf Cousins Studios (Stockholm, Sweden)
- Length: 3:30
- Label: RCA
- Songwriters: Alecia Moore; Max Martin; Shellback; Oscar Holter
- Producers: Max Martin; Shellback; Oscar Holter

Pink singles chronology
"Whatever You Want" (2018)	"Secrets" (2018)	"A Million Dreams" (2018)

Music video
- "Secrets" on YouTube

"Secrets" is a song recorded by American singer Pink from her seventh studio album Beautiful Trauma. Pink co-wrote the song with its producers, Max Martin, Shellback, and Oscar Holter. The song was released to hot adult contemporary radio on August 2, 2018, as the fourth and final single from the album.

== Music video ==
The official music video for the song was released on July 24, 2018. It features P!nk and the backup dancers from the Beautiful Trauma World Tour going out at night. It was filmed after one of P!nk's shows in Perth, Australia, at the RAC Arena.

== Critical reception ==
Andrew Unterberger of Billboard stated that “Secrets even has a touch of deep house to it. But it is unmistakably heavy”

== Track listing ==
Remixes EP

1. "Secrets" (Syn Cole Remix) – 3:10
2. "Secrets" (Until Dawn Remix) – 3:33
3. "Secrets" (Rescue Rangerz Remix) – 3:26
4. "Secrets" (DJ Suri and Chris Daniel Remix) – 3:46

== Charts ==
Chart (2018–19)	Peak position
Belgium (Ultratip Bubbling Under Flanders)	29
Belgium (Ultratip Bubbling Under Wallonia)	18
Croatia (HRT)	63
Finland Airplay (Radiosoittolista)	28
France Downloads (SNEP)	118
Hungary (Rádiós Top 40)	5
Hungary (Single Top 40)	37
Netherlands (Tipparade)	15
New Zealand Hot Singles (RMNZ)	13
Poland Airplay (ZPAV)	41
Romania (Airplay 100)	88
Slovakia Airplay (ČNS IFPI)	25
US Dance Club Songs (Billboard)	1

=== Year-end charts ===
Chart (2019)	Position
US Dance Club Songs (Billboard)	14

== Certifications ==
Certifications for "Secrets"
Region	Certification	Certified units/sales
Australia (ARIA)	Gold	35,000^{‡}
New Zealand (RMNZ)	Gold	15,000^{‡}
^{‡} Sales+streaming figures based on certification alone.
