= Rose Ave. =

Studio album by You+Me
- Released: October 14, 2014
- Recorded: 2014
- Genre: Folk
- Length: 36:59
- Labels: RCA; Dine Alone
- Producers: Alecia Moore; Dallas Green

Rose Ave. (stylized in all lowercase) is the debut studio album by North American folk music duo You+Me, consisting of Dallas Green and Alecia Moore (Pink). The album was released on October 14, 2014, through RCA and Dine Alone records. All songs were written and produced by Pink and Green except "No Ordinary Love", a song by English band Sade. The album debuted at number one on the Canadian Albums Chart and at number four on the Billboard 200.

== Background ==
Pink and Green had considered collaborating for several years. In March 2014, their schedules allowed them to get together. The intent was to sit down and explore the possibilities, not to produce an album. They had written bits and pieces in advance. Pink booked a studio as a precaution, and the two artists spent a full week in the studio writing and recording. The record label was unaware of the efforts. The album was almost entirely recorded within the week. The artists said the lack of the usual production pressures made it a rewarding experience. According to Green "this album is very personal for us." Pink said "The fact that there were no expectations – I think that's what made it so freeing (...) I just felt like I was doing it because I loved it." Once the recordings were done, the artists handed the project over to the record label. The album was named after the recording studio's location.

== Release ==
The album was released on October 14, 2014. Three of the songs premiered on the duo's Vevo channel prior to the album's release. The first single "You and Me" premiered on September 8, 2014, and was followed by "Break the Cycle" and "Capsized". Pink wrote "Break the Cycle" as a letter to her mother. The duo described their collaboration and songwriting process in two videos posted on their Vevo channel. The duo's first performance was on October 9, 2014, in Santa Monica, California.

== Promotion ==
On October 11, 2014, Pink and Green were interviewed on National Public Radio and described the circumstances of the first time they sang together. On October 13, 2014, the duo performed "You and Me" on the Ellen DeGeneres Show, and Pink took part in an interview. On October 15, videos of the duo's first live performance were released on the You+Me official Vevo channel. On October 16, the duo performed "You and Me" on the Jimmy Kimmel Show. On October 23, the duo performed at the Los Angeles House of Blues, and the proceeds benefited Saint John's Health Center cancer prevention program.

== Critical reception ==
Professional ratings
Review scores
Source	Rating
AllMusic	3.0/5 stars
The Guardian	4/5 stars

AllMusic editor Stephen Thomas Erlewine said about the atmosphere of the album: "sparseness [of arrangements] suggests intimacy and the prevalence of minor keys (...) suggests melancholy, two elements that make Rose Ave. feel cozy even when the music plays fairly broadly." Caroline Sullivan of The Guardian noticed the two voices together: "the pair explore pastoral byways, and it's a partnership of equals – while Pink often dominates their harmonies due to the featheriness of Green's voice, she gives him plenty of space."

== Commercial performance ==
In Canada, the album debuted at number-one on the Canadian Albums Chart, selling 23,000 copies. In the United States, the album debuted at number-four on the Billboard 200, selling 50,000 copies. The album debuted in the top 10 in Australia, New Zealand, Germany, Switzerland, Austria, and the United Kingdom.

== Track listing ==
All tracks are written by Dallas Green and Alecia Moore (Pink), except as noted.

No.	Title	Length
1.	"Capsized"	3:35
2.	"From a Closet in Norway (Oslo Blues)"	3:16
3.	"Gently"	3:32
4.	"Love Gone Wrong"	4:21
5.	"You and Me"	3:12
6.	"Unbeliever"	3:41
7.	"Second Guess"	3:27
8.	"Break the Cycle"	4:05
9.	"Open Door"	3:41
10.	"No Ordinary Love" (Sade Adu, Stuart Matthewman)	4:09

== Personnel ==
Credits adapted from Discogs.

You+Me

- Alecia Moore – vocals (all tracks), percussion (tracks 1, 4 & 6)
- Dallas Green – vocals (all tracks), guitar (tracks 1–9), percussion (tracks 4–7 & 9)

Additional Musicians

- Matt Kelly – pedal steel guitar (tracks 1, 5 & 9), piano (tracks 4, 8 & 10), organ (track 6), Wurlitzer (track 7)
- Alex Newport – bass (track 1)
- Stevie Blacke – string arrangement (track 8)

Technical

- Alecia Moore – production
- Dallas Green – production
- Alex Newport – mixing (tracks 1, 3–9)
- John X. Volaitis – engineering, mixing (tracks 2 & 10)
- Tom Coyne – mastering
- Roger Davies – management (Alecia Moore)
- Joel Carriere – management (Dallas Green)
- Tricia Ricciuto – management (Dallas Green)

Design

- Elliot Lee Hazel – photography
- Jeri Heiden – art direction, design
- Nick Steinhardt – art direction, design

== Charts ==
=== Weekly charts ===
Chart (2014)	Peak position
Australian Albums (ARIA)	2
Austrian Albums (Ö3 Austria)	7
Belgian Albums (Ultratop Flanders)	27
Belgian Albums (Ultratop Wallonia)	60
Canadian Albums Chart	1
Danish Albums (Hitlisten)	18
French Albums (SNEP)	37
German Albums (Offizielle Top 100)	6
Irish Albums (IRMA)	12
Italian Albums (FIMI)	50
Dutch Albums (Album Top 100)	12
New Zealand Albums (RMNZ)	7
Norwegian Albums (VG-lista)	28
Swiss Albums (Schweizer Hitparade)	7
UK Albums (OCC)	10
US Billboard 200	4
US Folk Albums	1

=== Year-end charts ===
Chart (2014)	Position
Australian Albums Chart	49
Canadian Albums (Billboard)	32
German Albums (Offizielle Top 100)	94
US Folk Albums (Billboard)	9

=== Promotional singles ===
List of singles, with selected chart positions
Title	Year	Peak chart positions				Album
Title	Year	AUT	CAN	GER	SWI	Album
"You and Me"	2014	68	48	91	64	Rose Ave.
"Break the Cycle"	2014	—	41	—	—	Rose Ave.
"Capsized"	2014	—	57	—	—	Rose Ave.

== Certifications ==
Region	Certification	Certified units/sales
Australia (ARIA)	Gold	35,000^{^}
Canada (Music Canada)	Platinum	80,000^{^}
^{^} Shipments figures based on certification alone.
