= You+Me =

Canadian-American folk music duo

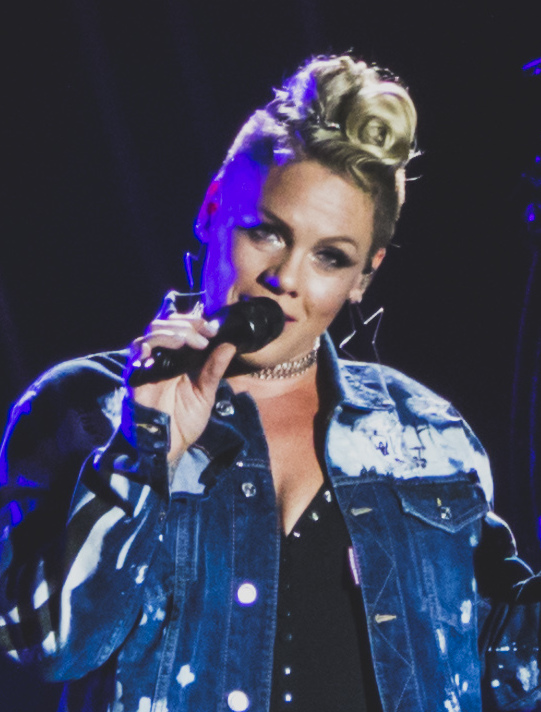
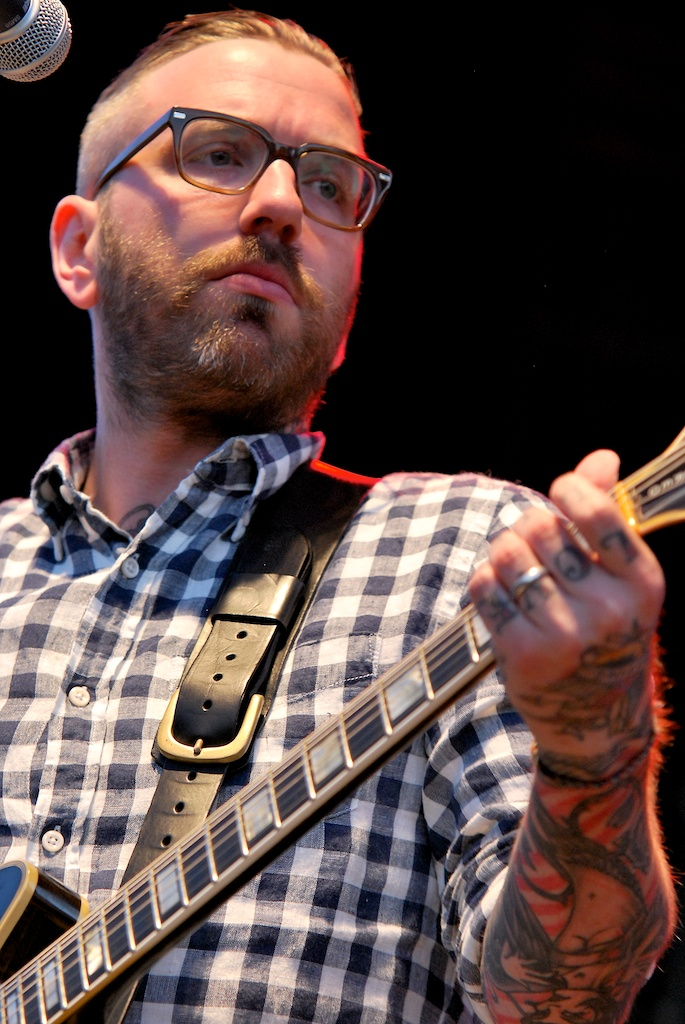
- Alecia Moore (left) and Dallas Green.

Background information
- Origin: Los Angeles, United States
- Genres: Folk
- Years active: 2014–present
- Labels: RCA/SME; Dine Alone
- Members: Dallas Green; Alecia Moore

You+Me is a Canadian-American folk music duo consisting of singers and songwriters Dallas Green, better known as City and Colour, and Alecia Moore, better known as Pink. Their debut album, entitled Rose Ave., was released on October 14, 2014, by RCA Records. The first promotional single from the album, "You and Me", premiered with a lyric video on their Vevo channel on September 8, 2014.

== History ==
=== Background ===
Moore and Green met through mutual friends several years prior to their collaboration in 2014. The first time they sang together Green had asked Moore to sing with him at one of his shows. They remained friends and Green opened several shows for Moore in the U.K. Moore had considered singing acoustic ballads, and as friends the two had considered collaborating for several years. In March 2014, their schedules allowed them to get together and compose original songs. They had written musical nuggets in advance, and their debut album Rose Ave. took shape within a week. The artists attributed their quick progress to the freedom from usual production pressures and the joy of making music together. The name of the duo, You+Me, is based on the two friends wanting to sing together.

Green recalls how the collaboration came about: "Alecia and I had talked about (working together) for a long time — not about making a record, but the idea of singing together and trying to write a song. (...) When we had the time to do it, that really lit a fire of creativity because it was something different. The idea of collaborating with a female voice and a different writer was what I needed, I guess, to create a bunch of new songs."

=== Rose Ave. ===
The duo's debut album Rose Ave. was released on October 14, 2014. The work was initiated and produced by Moore and Green. They had considered releasing the music independently; however, in order to reach a large audience and for legal concerns the album was released through Moore's label RCA Records. The album charted at number one in Canada and at number four in the United States, the home countries of the artists.

=== Upcoming second studio album ===
In an interview from June 2021, Green stated that he had recently written "almost a whole new record" for You+Me.

== Discography ==
=== Albums ===
List of studio albums, with selected chart positions and certifications
Title	Album details	Peak chart positions										Certifications
Title	Album details	AUS	AUT	CAN	GER	IRE	NLD	NZ	SWI	UK	US	Certifications
Rose Ave.	Released: October 14, 2014; Label: RCA; Formats: LP, CD, digital download	2	7	1	6	12	12	7	7	10	4	ARIA: Gold; MC: Platinum

=== Singles ===
List of singles, with selected chart positions
Title	Year	Peak chart positions					Album
Title	Year	AUT	CAN	GER	SWI	UK	Album
"You and Me"	2014	68	48	91	64	199	Rose Ave.
"Break the Cycle"	2014	—	41	—	—	—	Rose Ave.
"Capsized"	2014	—	57	—	—	—	Rose Ave.
