= Beautiful Trauma (song) =

2017 single by Pink

- Remix EP cover

Single by Pink

from the album Beautiful Trauma
- Released: November 21, 2017
- Studio: Earthstar Creation Center (Venice, California); Rough Customer Studio (Brooklyn Heights, New York); The Village Studios (Los Angeles, California)
- Genre: Power pop
- Length: 4:10
- Label: RCA
- Songwriters: Alecia Moore; Jack Antonoff
- Producer: Jack Antonoff

Pink singles chronology
"What About Us" (2017)	"Beautiful Trauma" (2017)	"Whatever You Want" (2018)

Music video
- "Beautiful Trauma" on YouTube

"Beautiful Trauma" is a song by American singer Pink. She co-wrote the track with its producer Jack Antonoff. It was released through RCA Records on September 28, 2017, as the first promotional single from Pink's seventh studio album, Beautiful Trauma (2017). The song was released to American contemporary hit radio as the second official single of the album on November 21, 2017. It has reached number one on Danish, German, and Polish radio.

== Release ==
Alongside the announcement of the track on Twitter, Pink explained her reasoning for the title of the album: "life is fucking traumatic. But it's also incredibly beautiful, too. There's a lot of beauty still and beautiful souls." The song was released on September 28, 2017, as a promotional single for her album, Beautiful Trauma. The song impacted BBC Radio 1 as an "A List" on November 10, 2017. The song released as the second official single of the album on November 21, 2017.

== Composition ==
"Beautiful Trauma" is performed in the key of G major with a tempo of 96 beats per minute in common time. Pink's vocals span two octaves, from G_{3} to G_{5}. It has been described as "oversized, emotional power-pop song".

== Critical reception ==
Andrew Unterberger from Billboard described the song as "elegant and bloody, shimmering and grungy… its life affirming without being pandering", whilst also noting that it was the "perfect lead single" choice. Hayden Wright from Radio.com reviewed the song positively, stating, "it’s an epic, dramatic track with stylistic range and plenty of heart".

== Music video ==
Two videos were released for the song. On October 12, 2017, a dance video featuring dancer and model Larsen Thompson and a company of male dancers was released, directed by Nick Florez and R. J. Durell, Pink's choreographers. On November 21, 2017, this was followed by an "official" music video featuring actor, producer, model, singer and dancer Channing Tatum. The video features Pink and Tatum as Fred and Ginger Hart. Throughout the video, Pink vacuums, irons a shirt and subsequently burns it, and burns a pie. The two then dance in drag, drink, and engage in role play with a second woman named Rhonda (portrayed by Nikki Tuazon). The music video was directed and choreographed by Florez and Durell. For the video, costume designer Kim Bowen won the Costume Designers Guild Award for Excellence in Short Form Design. In France, the scene of the end was cut and replace by another due to the sadomasochistic content and suggestives images.

== Live performances ==
Pink performed the song on Saturday Night Live on October 14, 2017, alongside "What About Us". She also performed the track on Good Morning America. On November 19, 2017, Pink performed "Beautiful Trauma" at the American Music Awards while suspended from a high wire off of a skyscraper. Pink also performed the song on the fourteenth series of The X Factor UK on December 3, 2017, alongside "What About Us".

== Track listing ==
- Digital download – The Remixes
1. "Beautiful Trauma" (Kat Krazy Remix) – 3:13
2. "Beautiful Trauma" (MOTi Remix) – 3:29
3. "Beautiful Trauma" (Nathan Jain Remix) – 2:33
4. "Beautiful Trauma" (E11even Remix) – 3:07

== Charts ==
=== Weekly charts ===
Chart (2017–18)	Peak position
Australia (ARIA)	25
Austria (Ö3 Austria Top 40)	45
Belgium (Ultratop 50 Flanders)	30
Belgium (Ultratop 50 Wallonia)	42
Canada Hot 100 (Billboard)	51
Canada AC (Billboard)	1
Canada CHR/Top 40 (Billboard)	32
Canada Hot AC (Billboard)	1
CIS Airplay (TopHit)	145
Czech Republic Airplay (ČNS IFPI)	3
Denmark Airplay (Tracklisten)	1
France (SNEP)	136
France Airplay (SNEP)	2
Guatemala (Monitor Latino Anglo)	10
Germany (GfK)	80
Germany (Airplay Chart)	1
Hungary (Rádiós Top 40)	6
Hungary (Single Top 40)	9
Ireland (IRMA)	80
Israel (Media Forest TV Airplay)	1
Mexico (Billboard Ingles Airplay)	13
Mexico Anglo (Monitor Latino)	18
Netherlands (Dutch Top 40)	14
Netherlands (Single Top 100)	99
New Zealand Heatseeker (RMNZ)	1
Philippines (Philippine Hot 100)	40
Poland Airplay (ZPAV)	1
Romania (Airplay 100)	48
Scotland Singles (Official Charts)	4
Slovakia Airplay (ČNS IFPI)	3
Slovenia (SloTop50)	10
Switzerland (Schweizer Hitparade)	46
UK Singles (Official Charts)	25
US Billboard Hot 100	78
US Adult Contemporary (Billboard)	15
US Adult Pop Airplay (Billboard)	4
US Dance Club Songs (Billboard)	1
US Pop Airplay (Billboard)	26

=== Year-end charts ===
Chart (2018)	Position
Belgium (Ultratop Flanders)	85
Hungary (Rádiós Top 40)	53
Hungary (Single Top 40)	77
Iceland (Plötutíóindi)	65
Netherlands (Dutch Top 40)	73
Slovenia (SloTop50)	26
US Adult Contemporary (Billboard)	40
US Adult Top 40 (Billboard)	20
US Dance Club Songs (Billboard)	9

== Certifications ==
Region	Certification	Certified units/sales
Australia (ARIA)	3× Platinum	210,000^{‡}
Brazil (Pro-Música Brasil)	Gold	20,000^{‡}
Canada (Music Canada)	2× Platinum	160,000^{‡}
Denmark (IFPI Danmark)	Platinum	90,000^{‡}
New Zealand (RMNZ)	Platinum	30,000^{‡}
Poland (ZPAV)	Platinum	20,000^{‡}
Switzerland (IFPI Switzerland)	Gold	10,000^{‡}
United Kingdom (BPI)	Platinum	600,000^{‡}
^{‡} Sales+streaming figures based on certification alone.

== See also ==
- List of number-one dance singles of 2018 (U.S.)
- List of number-one singles of 2018 (Poland)
