= Party Tour =

2002 concert tour by Pink

- World tour by Pink
- Promotional poster for the tour
- Location: Asia; Europe; North America; Oceania
- Associated album: Missundaztood
- Start date: May 2, 2002
- End date: December 18, 2002
- Legs: 3
- No. of shows: 56

Pink concert chronology
- Party Tour (2002); Try This Tour (2004)

The Party Tour was the debut concert tour by American recording artist, Pink. The tour supported her second studio album Missundaztood (2001).

== Background ==
While promoting her second studio album, Missundaztood, Pink stated she was proud of the "new" sound of the record and was ready to go on the road with her new band. Planning the tour, Pink was given complete control of all aspects of the tour including staging and opening acts. During an interview at the ESPY Awards, Pink mentioned she chose the group "Candy Ass" because she'd always wanted to be in an all-female band. She further stated that she would cover songs by her musical inspirations including 4 Non Blondes, Aerosmith, Janis Joplin, Guns N' Roses and Mary J. Blige.

The stage was very simplistic consisting of a backdrop resembling a brick wall with a graffiti text saying "P!nk", a video screen, lights, instruments, and one microphone. The show's setup was designed for the nightclubs and concert halls Pink would play that had an average audience size of 3,000 attendees. During this time, Pink's peers Britney Spears and Christina Aguilera were touring the U.S. as well in sports arenas and amphitheaters. Pink (who previously condemned the comparisons) stated:

"Big productions, to me, are great—like, I love going to Vegas and seeing shows—but I think that sometimes it's distracting, especially when you are there to listen to the music. I remember being on tour with 'NSYNC, and I don't know if this is appropriate, but it was something like a $5 million stage, and to me, that was just like, 'Man, I will take a box out there and stand on it with a microphone. I ain't spending that much money.' I love the shows that are in dingy little dark clubs, smoky, no production whatsoever. My stage show is raw and unpredictable. It's not a lot of choreography this time. There's practically no sequencing involved whatsoever. It's just instruments and a voice and incredible music. When there is a lot of sequencing or ProTools or DATs involved, it gets a little strange, so this is going to be definitely more organic."

During rehearsals, Pink contacted Lenny Kravitz and jokingly stated she was rehearsing to be the opening act on his upcoming North American tour. She invited the rock singer to watch her rehearse. She also sent him a pair of black and pink panties with "The P!nk/Lenny Tour" written on them. Upon the completion of her North America dates, Pink continued to tour the United States as the opening act for the "Lenny Live Tour". Once her outing with Kravitz was complete, the singer set out on a mini-tour of Europe, visiting England, Ireland and Germany. She continued her tour into Japan and New Zealand before touring Australia with the "Rumba Festival".

The tour was sponsored by Bally Total Fitness, giving the tour the sponsored name, "Bally Total Fitness presents Pink's 'The Party Tour 2002'". In conjunction with the sponsorship, the fitness center launched the "Get Your Body Started" movement classes in over 400 Ballys throughout the US and Canada. The centers also hosted dance competitions set to Missundaztood.

== Opening acts ==
- Candy Ass (North America)
- The Kennedy Soundtrack (United Kingdom)
- Lucky 7 (Honolulu)

== Setlist ==
The following setlist was obtained from the concert held on June 1, 2002, at the Tower Theater in Upper Darby Township, Pennsylvania. It does not represent all concerts for the duration of the tour

1. "Instrumental Sequence" (contains elements of "Most Girls")
2. "Get the Party Started"
3. "Missundaztood"
4. "18 Wheeler"
5. "What's Up?"
6. "Dear Diary"
7. "Respect"
8. "I Love You" / "You're All I Need to Get By"
9. "Janie's Got a Gun"
10. "You Make Me Sick"
11. "Just Like a Pill"
12. "Lonely Girl"
13. "Instrumental Sequence" (contains elements of "Sweet Child o' Mine")
14. "Numb"
15. "Summertime" / "Piece of My Heart" / "Me and Bobby McGee"
16. "Family Portrait"
17. "My Vietnam" (contains elements of "The Star-Spangled Banner")

Encore

18. "Eventually"
19. "There You Go"
20. "Don't Let Me Get Me"

*During the concert at the Rose Bowl in Pasadena, California, Pink performed "Misery" with Steven Tyler in lieu of "Janie's Got a Gun"

== Tour dates ==
List of 2002 concerts
Date	City	Country	Venue
May 2, 2002	Phoenix	United States	Web Theatre
May 4, 2002	Tucson	United States	AVA Amphitheater
May 5, 2002	Las Vegas	United States	Rain in the Desert
May 7, 2002	Salt Lake City	United States	Kingsbury Hall
May 9, 2002	Denver	United States	Fillmore Auditorium
May 10, 2002	Bernalillo	United States	Cheenh Lounge
May 12, 2002	Austin	United States	Austin Music Hall
May 14, 2002	Houston	United States	Verizon Wireless Theater
May 15, 2002	Grand Prairie	United States	NextStage Performance Theater
May 18, 2002	Orlando	United States	Hard Rock Live
May 19, 2002	Fort Lauderdale	United States	Au-Rene Theater
May 22, 2002	Atlanta	United States	The Tabernacle
May 25, 2002	Hershey	United States	Star Pavilion
May 26, 2002	Wallingford	United States	careerbuilder.com Oakdale Theatre
May 28, 2002	New York City	United States	Beacon Theatre
May 29, 2002	New York City	United States	Beacon Theatre
May 31, 2002	Boston	United States	Orpheum Theatre
June 1, 2002	Upper Darby Township	United States	Tower Theater
June 2, 2002^{[A]}	East Rutherford	United States	Giants Stadium
June 4, 2002	Washington, D.C.	United States	Nation
June 5, 2002	Cleveland	United States	Tower City Amphitheatre
June 7, 2002	Pittsburgh	United States	I.C. Light Amphitheater
June 9, 2002	Toronto	Canada	Massey Hall
June 10, 2002	Detroit	United States	State Theatre
June 12, 2002	Rosemont	United States	Rosemont Theatre
June 13, 2002	Minneapolis	United States	Orpheum Theatre
June 15, 2002^{[B]}	Pasadena	United States	Rose Bowl
June 18, 2002	Spokane	United States	Spokane Opera House
June 19, 2002	Vancouver	Canada	Orpheum Theatre
June 22, 2002	Portland	United States	Theatre of Clouds
June 24, 2002	Santa Rosa	United States	Ruth Finley Person Theater
June 25, 2002	San Francisco	United States	Warfield Theatre
June 28, 2002	Los Angeles	United States	Wiltern Theatre
June 29, 2002	Los Angeles	United States	Wiltern Theatre
June 30, 2002	San Diego	United States	San Diego County Fair Grandstand
November 5, 2002	Manchester	England	Manchester Apollo
November 6, 2002	Dublin	Ireland	Point Theatre
November 8, 2002	Cologne	Germany	E-Werk
November 11, 2002	Birmingham	England	Carling Academy
November 12, 2002	London	England	O_{2} Brixton Academy
November 19, 2002	Osaka	Japan	Kōsei Nenkin Kaikan
November 21, 2002	Tokyo	Japan	Tokyo International Forum
November 22, 2002	Tokyo	Japan	Shibuya Public Hall
November 26, 2002	Dunedin	New Zealand	Dunedin Town Hall
November 27, 2002	Christchurch	New Zealand	Westpac Centre
November 29, 2002	Wellington	New Zealand	Queens Wharf Events Centre
November 30, 2002^{[C]}	Auckland	New Zealand	Western Springs Stadium
December 3, 2002^{[C]}	Perth	Australia	Subiaco Oval
December 6, 2002^{[C]}	Adelaide	Australia	Adelaide Oval
December 8, 2002^{[C]}	Melbourne	Australia	Telstra Dome
December 10, 2002	Gold Coast	Australia	Twin Towns S Club
December 11, 2002^{[C]}	Brisbane	Australia	ANZ Stadium
December 12, 2002	Wollongong	Australia	Wollongong Entertainment Centre
December 14, 2002^{[C]}	Sydney	Australia	Telstra Stadium
December 18, 2002	Honolulu	United States	Blaisdell Arena

Festivals and other miscellaneous performances
^{A} This concert was a part of "Zootopia"
^{B} This concert was a part of "Wango Tango"
^{C} These concerts were a part of "Rumba Festival"

=== Box office score data ===
Venue	City	Tickets sold / available	Gross revenue
Beacon Theatre	New York City	5,509 / 5,788 (95%)	$208,260
Blaisdell Arena	Honolulu	3,639 / 4,870 (75%)	$139,530
TOTAL		9,148 / 10,658 (86%)	$347,790

== Critical reception ==
Overall, the tour received high praise from critics. Many noted Pink's raw energy displayed during her concerts, taking the audience on a musical roller coaster of R&B, rock and pop music. Some critics drew comparisons of the Philadelphia singer to Madonna. Robin Vaughn (The Boston Phoenix) writes, "Chrissie Hynde she's not, but somewhere between Shirley Manson and Madonna, Pink's rock-star niche is a natural. Pink's material may not be revolutionary art, but revolution, however vaguely imagined, was clearly a theme. She gave the girls some grown-up stuff to think about, and it wasn’t heavy on how to be a 21st-century bimbo". Christina Fuoco commented on Pink's performance at Phoenix's Web Theatre stating, "She was playful, holding the microphone over the crowd to let them sing the chorus of "There You Go", one of the few tunes from Can't Take Me Home she played. The playfulness segued to visual irritation when a fan threw a tampon on stage as a gift.". A staff writer for NME writes, "All of which would amount to sweet FA, of course, if it wasn't for the fact that she also happens to have authored three of this year's greatest pop songs. Anyone whose pulse doesn't race to the set opener, 'Get The Party Started' might as well be dead. 'Just Like A Pill' is a gem that manages to ride its chic innuendo into real realms of romantic suffering and 'Dear Diary' is a sweet liaison between Madonna's 'Don't Tell Me' and The Verve's 'The Drugs Don't Work'".

== Personnel ==
Production

- Lighting Designer: Ethan Weber
- Lighting Technicians: Adam Finer and Marty Langley
- Production Manager: Ian Kinnersley

Band

- Keyboards: Jason Chapman and Cassandra O'Neal
- Drums: Mylious Johnson
- Guitar: Rafael Moriera
- Bass guitar: Janis Tanaka
- Backing vocalist: Cassandra O'Neal and Janis Tanaka
