= Can't Take Me Home =

2000 album by Pink

Studio album by Pink
- Released: April 4, 2000
- Recorded: 1999
- Studios: Unique Recording Studios, New York City
- Genres: Dance-pop; R&B
- Length: 54:21
- Labels: LaFace; Arista
- Producers: Terence Abney; Kevin Briggs; Steve Clarke; Brainz Dimilo; Kenneth Edmonds; Sean Hall; Soulshock & Karlin; Lamont Maxwell; P.A.; Will & Pete; Anthony President; Daryl Simmons; The Specialist; Christopher Stewart; Daron Jones

Pink chronology
Can't Take Me Home (2000)	Missundaztood (2001)

Singles from Can't Take Me Home
- 1. "There You Go" Released: January 18, 2000; 2. "Most Girls" Released: June 6, 2000; 3. "You Make Me Sick" Released: December 5, 2000

Can't Take Me Home is the debut studio album by American singer and songwriter Pink. It was released on April 4, 2000, through LaFace Records, two years after the disbanding of her girl group Choice. An R&B and dance-pop record, Can't Take Me Home was produced by Kevin "She'kspere" Briggs, Babyface, Kandi Burruss, Terence "Tramp Baby" Abney, Daryl Simmons, and Tricky, while Pink shares songwriting credits on seven out of thirteen tracks. L.A. Reid served as the executive producer of the record. Lyrically, most tracks on the album speak about relationships.

The album was a commercial success, peaking in the top ten in Australia and the top twenty in the United Kingdom and Canada. In the United States, it peaked at the 26 spot in the Billboard 200 chart. Retrospectively, it was certified double Platinum in Canada, Australia and the United States, and Platinum in the United Kingdom and New Zealand. Can't Take Me Home received mixed-to-positive reception from contemporary music critics, with some of them comparing the style of the record with those of Destiny's Child, Aaliyah and TLC. Later, Pink revealed her dissatisfaction with the music direction of the album, her personal image during its promotional campaign and her lack of creative control.

Three singles supported the release of Can't Take Me Home. "There You Go" and "Most Girls" received huge commercial success, both landing inside the top ten in the charts of Australia, Canada, New Zealand, the United Kingdom and the United States, where they peaked at numbers 7 and 4 respectively. The third single, "You Make Me Sick", was less successful worldwide, but it peaked at the nine spot on the United Kingdom singles chart. Following the commercial success of the singles from the album, Pink won the New Female Artist of the Year award at the 2000 Billboard Music Awards.

== Background ==
In 1995, Pink and two other teenage girls, Sharon Flanagan and Chrissy Conway, formed the R&B group Choice. A copy of their first song, "Key to My Heart", was sent to LaFace Records in Atlanta, Georgia, where L.A. Reid overheard it and arranged for the group to fly there so he could see them perform. Afterward, he signed them to a recording contract with the label. The group relocated to the label's then-headquarters in Atlanta to record an album. Despite it failing to see a commercial release, their song "Key to My Heart" appeared on the soundtrack to the 1996 film Kazaam. During a Christmas party, Reid gave Pink an ultimatum: "go solo or go home." Choice subsequently disbanded in 1998.

After Choice disbanded, Pink signed a recording contract with LaFace Records and began working on her first solo album with producers like Babyface, Kandi Burruss and Tricky Stewart.

== Composition ==
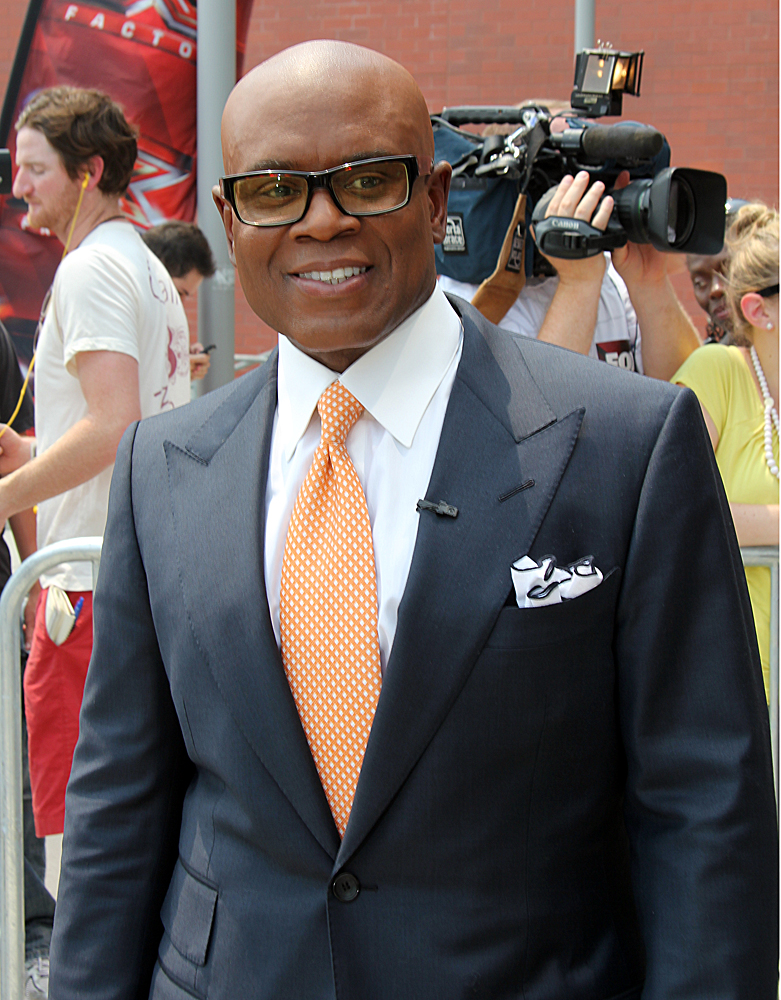
L.A. Reid, the executive producer of the record (pictured in 2011)

=== Overview ===
Can't Take Me Home is a dance-pop and R&B record. It was compared with the works of TLC, especially their 1999 record FanMail — both albums share the same team of producers and L.A. Reid as the executive producer. Recording sessions for the album took place in Unique Recording Studios, New York City. Can't Take Me Home was produced by Kevin "She'kspere" Briggs, Babyface, Kandi Burruss, Terence "Tramp Baby" Abney, Daryl Simmons, and Tricky. Pink co-wrote seven out of thirteen tracks on the album. Lyrically, the main themes of the record are love and relationships.

=== Songs ===
The album opens with "Split Personality", a "schizoid" track, where Pink sings about her mental condition: "You don't know me well enough to label me sick, or even disturbed / When you break it down I'm just two girls / Everybody's got insanities / I got a split personality." "Let Me Let You Know" is an "affecting ballad", where Pink uses "Mariah Carey warbling." "There You Go" was found similar to "Bills Bills Bills" by Destiny's Child and "No Scrubs" by TLC with its themes of female empowerment and independence, which are echoed in "Most Girls".

== Release and promotion ==
The album was released on April 4, 2000, through LaFace Records. To promote the record, Pink was billed as a supporting act on the North American leg of NSYNC's No Strings Attached Tour throughout the summer of 2000. Pink also performed "Most Girls" at the 2001 American Music Awards.

=== Singles ===
"There You Go" was released as the lead single from the album on January 18, 2000. Following its release, it received positive receptions from the music critics, who called it "edgy". It first entered the Billboard Hot 100 chart on the issue dated March 4, at the 25th spot. Six weeks later it peaked at number seven. Additionally, it peaked at number 2 on the Dance/Club Songs and the Pop Songs charts, and number 4 on the Rhythmic radio chart. It was certified Gold by RIAA for shipment of 500,000 copies in the United States. Elsewhere, it peaked inside the top ten in the charts of eight more countries, including number 2 in Australia, where it eventually received Platinum certification by ARIA for shipment of 70,000 copies. It also gained Platinum certification in the United Kingdom and Gold in New Zealand. The accompanying music video for "There You Go" was directed by Dave Meyers and debuted via The Box in late November 1999.

"Most Girls" was released as the second single from the album on June 6, 2000. it proved to be even more successful than the lead single, reaching top ten position in six countries, including top position in Australia, where it was eventually certified double Platinum by ARIA, where it was eventually certified Gold. In the United States, it debuted at number 85 on the Billboard Hot 100 chart on the issue dated August 12, 2000. Three months later, it rose up to number four, becoming her highest charting solo single in the States until 2008, when she topped the chart with "So What". "Most Girls" was also her first single to top the Rhythmic radio chart. As of November 2010, it sold out 95,000 copies in the United States.

The third single, "You Make Me Sick", impacted American radio stations on November 27, 2000, as the album's third and final single. It was less successful than previous, only reaching number 33 in the United States. However, it peaked inside the top ten in the United Kingdom, New Zealand and Netherlands. It was eventually certified Gold in Australia. As of November 2010, it sold out 93,000 copies in the United States. The accompanying music video for "You Make Me Sick" was filmed in late 2000 and was directed by Dave Meyers."You Make Me Sick" was featured in the 2001 film and the soundtrack for Save the Last Dance.

=== Other songs ===
"Split Personality", which was not released as a single, was featured in the 2001 film The Princess Diaries.

== Critical reception ==
Professional ratings
Review scores
Source	Rating
AllMusic	4/5 stars
Christgau's Consumer Guide	B+
Entertainment Weekly	C+
MTV Asia	5/10
NME	3/5 stars
Q	4/5 stars
Rolling Stone	2.5/5 stars
Slant Magazine	2.5/5 stars
Sputnikmusic	2.5/5
Tom Hull – on the Web	B+

Can't Take Me Home received mixed-to-positive reviews from music critics. Stephen Thomas Erlewine, the senior editor of AllMusic, found the album similar to the works of TLC, but he complemented Pink's vocal performance, saying, that "she may not be able to deliver ballads with assurance and soul just yet, but she never over-sings". Commenting on the album's content, he wrote: "While there are no bad cuts on Can't Take Me Home, there aren't any knock-out punches, either." Robert Christgau also gave a positive review, grading it B+. He commented: "When she admits to the loss of her slurred "cherry" in the finale, you can only wonder how sexy she'll be when she shows pink for real". NME gave a positive review on the album, grading it six out of ten. saying: "Sadly, Pink's debut is a little samey and suffers from the diva disease that modern R&B acts [...] are helping to stamp out." Q also gave a positive review, giving it four out of five stars.

Entertainment Weekly gave the album a mixed review, grading it C+. They were critical towards its originality, saying: "Home [...] sounds as familiar as your doorbell; there's hardly an original musical moment on it". Jam! and MTV Asia also gave mixed reviews; the latter gave album the grade five out of ten, saying that "Pink's music is typical stuff, stuff that puts her in the same vein as current R&B". They added: "At the end of the day, I guess it still comes down to her hair color and streetwise attitude. After all, music is not always the main reason why an artist becomes hip and popular all of a sudden.". Rolling Stone gave a mixed review, giving it two and a half out of five stars. They wrote: "Her debut has one awesome single in "There You Go", whose wronged-woman sass is set to a stop-start groove so bling-bling it redeems a chorus", continuing: "Beyond that, though, every melismatic groan, every clipped harmony, every post-Timbaland beat, every synth setting is copped from some R&B hit of the last eighteen months." They concluded their review, saying that "[Pink] makes a pretty good Monica, but we already have one of those."

=== Accolades ===
On the 2000 MTV Video Music Awards, she was nominated in the Best New Artist category. On the 2000 Billboard Music Awards, Pink was honored with New Female Artist of the Year for commercial performance of the album and its singles. She was also nominated for Female Hot 100 Singles Artist and Female Artist of the Year. On the 2001 Brit Awards, she was nominated for Best International Female Solo Artist and Best International Newcomer. On the 2001 American Music Awards, Pink was nominated for Favorite Soul/R&B New Artist.

== Commercial performance ==
Can't Take Me Home received moderate commercial success worldwide. In the United States, it debuted at number 26 on the Billboard 200 chart. It is Pink's only studio album to not enter the top ten of the chart. It spent fifty nine weeks on the chart, and ranked number 66 on the Billboard Year-End chart in 2000. It also ranked at number 89 on Billboard's Year-End chart in 2001. Can't Take Me Home also entered the R&B/Hip Hop Albums chart, peaking at number twenty three. It spent fifty five weeks on the chart and was ranked eighty seventh on Billboard's Year-End chart in 2000. Eventually, Can't Take Me Home was certified double Platinum by RIAA for shipments of two million copies in the United States. In Canada, the album peaked at number nineteen, while peaking at number 4 on the Canadian R&B Albums chart. It was the 33rd best-selling album in Canada of 2000 and 177 in 2001. It reached double platinum status by Music Canada for shipments of 200,000 copies in the country.

In Australia, the album peaked at number ten and topped the Australian R&B Albums chart. It was the 32nd best-selling album in Australia in 2000 and eventually it was certified double platinum by ARIA for shipments of 140,000 copies in the country. In New Zealand, Can't Take Me Home peaked at number twelve and was ranked the forty-fourth best-performing album of 2000. It was eventually certified Platinum by the Recording Industry Association of New Zealand for shipments of fifteen thousand copies. In the United Kingdom, the album peaked at number thirteen and was certified Platinum by the British Phonographic Industry. It ranked at number 67 on the British year-end chart of 2000 and at number 176 in 2011. It also reached number three on the UK R&B Albums chart.

Elsewhere, the album reached number 48 in Belgium, 58 in the Netherlands, 85 in Germany, 23 in Ireland and 26 in Scotland.

== Retrospective commentary ==
Despite Can't Take Me Home's success, Pink felt dissatisfied and constrained by her lack of creative control and being marketed to a teen audience as an R&B singer. Her father, Jim Moore, said in an October 2000 MTV News interview that Pink expressed interest in experimenting and showcasing her versatility on her forthcoming album. She sought to create an album reflective of the musical influences with which she grew up, resembling the music of Annie Lennox and Method Man.

Tired of being marketed as another cookie cutter pop act, as well as eager both to be seen as a more serious songwriter and musician and to perform the type of music she wanted to, Pink took her sound in a new direction and sought more artistic or creative control during the recording of her second album, Missundaztood. She recruited Linda Perry, former singer of 4 Non Blondes. Perry co-wrote and co-produced the album with Dallas Austin and Scott Storch, and according to VH1's Driven program, Antonio "LA" Reid of LaFace Records was not initially content with the new music Pink was making. Reid was concerned about Pink departing from her R&B sound, alienating an audience who was expecting another album like Can't Take Me Home. Her desire for more creative control met with resistance, but Reid failed to persuade Pink to record more R&B songs. After a vigorous dispute, he relented and gave Pink "the opportunity to fail". The album, named Missundaztood because of Pink's belief that people had a wrong image of her, was released in November 2001. Kate Sullivan of Spin called Pink's direction on the album "a rebellion against the producer-driven machinery that created her 2000 debut, Can't Take Me Home".

Most critics praised the musical departure from contemporary music and altering the industry's perception of Pink as an artist. Robert Hilburn wrote for the Los Angeles Times that Pink's reinvention (and its potential commercial impact) was initially questioned, but was later "a move industry observers now applaud as brilliant". In her 2019 book, White Negroes, Lauren Michele Jackson compared Pink's rebellious artistic transformation with Janet Jackson's Control (1986). According to Jackson, Pink's choice to leave the black-dominated R&B industry would "ultimately keep her apart from her peers". In a 2021 retrospective, Arielle Gordon of Stereogum said that Pink's opposition to her label's pressure to remain an R&B singer "somehow wrestled autonomy of her image and sound in an industry practically fueled by harnessing complete control of their young, primarily female stars."

Due to Pink's opinion on the album, she did not perform its songs from 2001 until her 2013 The Truth About Love Tour.

On a 2012 interview with Los Angeles Times, Pink said:

"I loved 'Can't Take Me Home.' The only thing I didn't like was I didn't have a say. Back then in Atlanta, it wasn't about the artist, it was about the producer and especially new artists."

In a 2019 interview with Variety she said: "A lot of it was me: There are a few songs that came from my time in the Bronx, like 'Hiccup', 'Is it Love' and 'Can't Take Me Home.' 'Split Personality' was mine — I wrote that on the beach in Miami. I was really young. I was on my own. And I was making music. I thought my shit didn't stink. So, yeah, it was really fun."

== Track listing ==
Can't Take Me Home – Standard edition
No.	Title	Writer(s)	Producer(s)	Length
1.	"Split Personality"	Alecia "Pink" Moore; Terence "Tramp-Baby" Abney; Kenneth "Babyface" Edmonds	Babyface; Abney; Daryl Simmons	4:01
2.	"Hell wit Ya"	Moore; Kevin "She'kspere" Briggs; Kandi Burruss; Darius Green	Briggs; Burruss^{[a]}	2:58
3.	"Most Girls"	Edmonds; Damon Thomas	Babyface	4:59
4.	"There You Go"	Moore; Briggs; Burruss	Briggs; Burruss^{[a]}	3:23
5.	"You Make Me Sick"	Obi Nwobosi; Ainsworth Prasad; Marthony Tabb	Babyface; Anthony President; Brainz Dimilo	4:08
6.	"Let Me Let You Know"	Neal Creque; Sean Hall; Christopher "Tricky" Stewart; Robin Thicke	Tricky; Hall	4:45
7.	"Love Is Such a Crazy Thing"	Jason Boyd; Daron Jones; Michael Keith; Quinnes Parker; Marvin Scandrick; Lamont "Stro" Maxwell; Courtney Sills	Lamont Maxwell; Jones	5:14
8.	"Private Show"	Kenneth Karlin; Andrea Martin; Ivan Matias; Carsten "Soulshock" Schack	Soulshock & Karlin	4:15
9.	"Can't Take Me Home"	Moore; Harold Frasier; Steve "Rhythm" Clarke	The Specialists; Clarke	3:39
10.	"Stop Falling"	Moore; Will Baker; Pete Woodruff	Will & Pete	5:51
11.	"Do What U Do"	James Hollins; Ezekiel Lewis; Kawan Prather; Maurice "Big Reese" Sinclair	P.A.	3:58
12.	"Hiccup"	Moore; Harold Frasier; Delouie Avant; Steve "Rhythm" Clarke	The Specialists; Clarke	3:32
13.	"Is It Love"	Moore; Frasier; Avant; Clarke; Aaron Philips	Clarke; Pink^{[b]}	3:38

Can't Take Me Home – United Kingdom special edition and digital expanded edition bonus tracks
No.	Title	Writer(s)	Length
14.	"There You Go" (Sovereign Mix)	Moore; Briggs; Burruss	6:20
15.	"Most Girls" (X-Men Vocal Mix)	Edmonds; Thomas	4:53

Notes

- ^{^[a]} signifies a vocal producer
- ^{^[b]} signifies a co-producer

Sample credits

- "Let Me Let You Know" contains elements from "Cease the Bombing", written by Neal Creque, performed by Grant Greene.

== Personnel ==
- Pink – vocals
- Terence "Tramp Baby" Abney – keyboards, producer, drum programming
- Babyface – producer
- Harold Frasier – producer, keyboards
- Steve "Rhythm" Clarke – producer, drum programming
- Will Baker – vocal arrangement
- Steve Baughman – assistant
- Kerren Berz – strings, string arrangements
- Elliot Blakely – assistant
- Paul Boutin – engineer
- Jason Boyd – arranger
- Kandi Burruss – producer, backing vocals
- Josh Butler – engineer
- Ralph Cacciurri – assistant
- Chris Champion – engineer
- Rob Chiarelli – mixing
- Chrissy Conway – backing vocals
- Lysa Cooper – stylist
- Sharon A. Daley – A&R
- Regina Davenport – artist coordination
- Kevin "KD" Davis – mixing
- Blake Eiseman – engineer
- Daniela Federici – photography
- Paul Foley – engineer
- Sherree Ford-Payne – backing vocals
- John Frye – engineer

== Charts ==
=== Weekly charts ===
Chart (2000–2001)	Peak position
Australian Albums (ARIA)	10
Australian Urban Albums (ARIA)	1
Belgian Albums (Ultratop Wallonia)	48
Canadian Albums (Billboard)	19
Canadian R&B Albums (Nielsen SoundScan)	4
Dutch Albums (Album Top 100)	58
European Top 100 Albums (Music & Media)	53
German Albums (Offizielle Top 100)	85
Irish Albums (IRMA)	23
New Zealand Albums (RMNZ)	12
Scottish Albums (Official Charts)	26
UK Albums (Official Charts)	13
UK R&B Albums (Official Charts)	3
US Billboard 200	26
US Top R&B/Hip-Hop Albums (Billboard)	23

=== Year-end charts ===
Year-end chart performance for Can't Take Me Home
Chart (2000)	Position
Australian Albums (ARIA)	32
Canadian Albums (Nielsen SoundScan)	39
New Zealand Albums (RMNZ)	44
UK Albums (OCC)	67
US Billboard 200	66
US Top R&B/Hip-Hop Albums (Billboard)	87

Chart (2001)	Position
Canadian Albums (Nielsen SoundScan)	177
Canadian R&B Albums (Nielsen SoundScan)	37
UK Albums (OCC)	176
US Billboard 200	98

Chart (2002)	Position
Canadian R&B Albums (Nielsen SoundScan)	101

== Certifications ==
Region	Certification	Certified units/sales
Australia (ARIA)	2× Platinum	140,000^{^}
Canada (Music Canada)	2× Platinum	200,000^{^}
New Zealand (RMNZ)	Platinum	15,000^{^}
United Kingdom (BPI)	Platinum	300,000^{^}
United States (RIAA)	2× Platinum	2,000,000^{^}
^{^} Shipments figures based on certification alone.
