= Don't Let Me Get Me =

2002 single by Pink

Single by Pink

from the album Missundaztood
- Released: February 18, 2002
- Studio: Pinetree (Miami Beach, Florida); DARP (Atlanta, Georgia)
- Genre: Rock
- Length: 3:30
- Label: Arista; BMG
- Songwriters: Pink; Dallas Austin
- Producer: Dallas Austin

Pink singles chronology
"Get the Party Started" (2001)	"Don't Let Me Get Me" (2002)	"Just Like a Pill" (2002)

Music video
- "Don't Let Me Get Me" on YouTube

"Don't Let Me Get Me" is a song by American singer Pink. It was written by Pink and Dallas Austin and produced by the latter for her second studio album, Missundaztood (2001). The song was released as the second single from the album on February 18, 2002. It received positive reviews from music critics, who praised the tone of the song.

Commercially, the song became Pink's fifth single to enter the top 10 of the US Billboard Hot 100, rising to number eight, and was her first number one on the Billboard Mainstream Top 40 chart. Outside the US, the song became Pink's third consecutive number-one single in New Zealand and reached the top 10 in 14 other countries, including Australia, Ireland, Sweden, and the United Kingdom. A music video promoting the single was filmed and released in January 2002.

== Composition ==
"Don't Let Me Get Me" is set in the key of E♭ major in common time with a tempo of 98 beats per minute. The song moves at a chord progression of E♭–Cm–B♭–A♭, and Pink's vocals span from E♭_{3} to B♭_{4}. During live performances, Pink has since changed the controversial "damn Britney Spears" lyric to "sweet Britney Spears."

== Critical reception ==
The song earned positive reports from music critics, but most gave sensitively mixed reviews upon her self-hating lyrical content. Robert Christgau in his consumer guide for MSN wrote that "Despite Pink's audacious claim that she's not as pretty as 'damn Britney Spears,' celebrity anxiety takes a backseat to a credible personal pain rooted in credible family travails, a pain held at bay by expression." Jim Farber of Entertainment Weekly wrote that "In Don't Let Me Get Me, she turns self-loathing into a perverse kind of anthem."

Jason Thompson of PopMatters wrote, "on the power rock of 'Don’t Let Me Get Me,' Pink herself tells it like it is and attempts to break free from the image making machine. 'Tired of being compared / To damn Britney Spears / She’s so pretty / That just ain’t me.' Well, that’s debatable in itself, but the fact that Pink takes it upon herself to call Spears out should be nothing short of revelatory. Spears certainly has nothing on Pink in the vocal department. Pink can actually sing. And damn well, mind you."

Jim Alexander wrote a negative review, saying that the rest of Missundaztood is full of bad songs and that "'Don't Let Me Get Me' and 'Dear Diary' see all pop joy expunged for acoustic seriousness, dreary unobtrusive beats and lyrics about relationship woes and record company badness."

== Music video ==
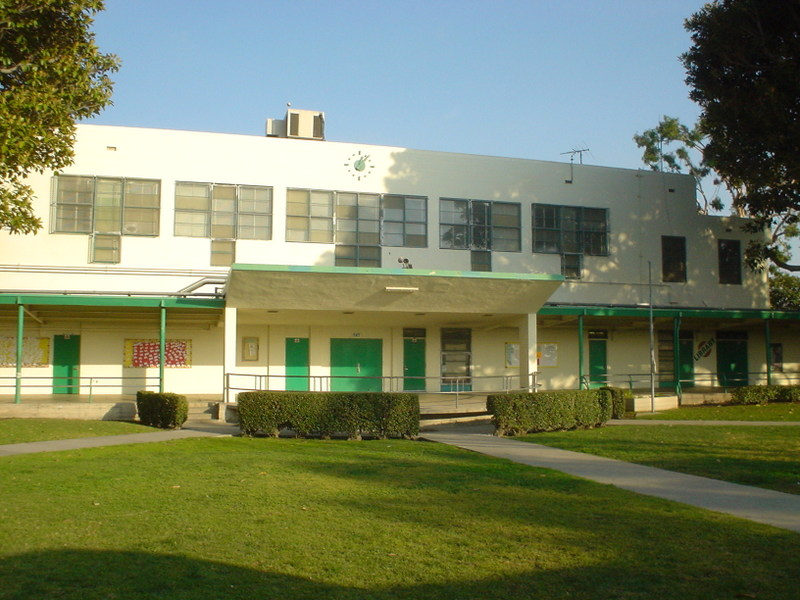
Portions of the music video were filmed at Dorsey High School.

A music video for "Don't Let Me Get Me" was shot on January 4–6, 2002 in Los Angeles and Malibu, California. Pink reteamed with frequent collaborator Dave Meyers to film the visuals. Most of the scenes were shot at Susan Miller Dorsey High School, a high school located in the Crenshaw District of Los Angeles, while additional sequences, set at an office and during a photo shoot, were filmed at a private Malibu residence. Ted Lyde portrays music executive L.A. Reid in the video.

The video depicts Pink as a high school student, in various scenes in which her nonconformity causes conflict with other students and school officials. A similarly-themed scene depicts her meeting with Reid, who tells her that in order to obtain stardom, she will have to change everything about her persona, in order to exhibit a greater resemblance to Britney Spears, despite Pink's insistence that that is not how she sees herself. Yet another scene shows her modeling for the cover of a magazine, irritated at how she is being made up by the lighting technicians, makeup artists and other personnel involved in the shoot. The video then shifts to a scene in which Pink, now in control over her career, is welcomed back to her high school for a concert there.

== Track listings ==
US and European DVD single

1. "Don't Let Me Get Me" (video)
2. "Get the Party Started" (video)
3. "Get the Party Started" (behind the scenes footage)
4. Photo gallery

UK CD single

1. "Don't Let Me Get Me" (John Shanks remix) – 3:16
2. "Don't Let Me Get Me" (radio mix) – 3:31
3. "Don't Let Me Get Me" (Maurice's Nu Soul Mix) – 6:03
4. "Don't Let Me Get Me" (video) – 3:30

UK cassette single

1. "Don't Let Me Get Me" (John Shanks remix) – 3:16
2. "Don't Let Me Get Me" (radio mix) – 3:31

European CD single

1. "Don't Let Me Get Me" (radio mix) – 3:31
2. "Don't Let Me Get Me" (John Shanks remix) – 3:16

European maxi-CD single

1. "Don't Let Me Get Me" (radio mix) – 3:31
2. "Don't Let Me Get Me" (John Shanks remix) – 3:16
3. "Don't Let Me Get Me" (Maurice's Nu Soul Mix) – 6:03
4. "Get the Party Started/Sweet Dreams" (featuring Redman) – 4:05
5. "Don't Let Me Get Me" (video) – 3:30

Australian CD single

1. "Don't Let Me Get Me" (radio mix) – 3:31
2. "Don't Let Me Get Me" (John Shanks remix) – 3:16
3. "There You Go" (live from Sydney) – 3:35
4. "Don't Let Me Get Me" (Juicy Horn Mix) – 9:32

== Credits and personnel ==
Credits are taken from the Missundaztood album booklet.

Studios

- Recorded at Pinetree Studios (Miami Beach, Florida) and DARP Studios (Atlanta, Georgia)
- Mixed at Larrabee Studios North (North Hollywood, California)
- Mastered at Hit Factory Mastering (New York City)

Personnel

- Pink – writing, vocals, background vocals
- Dallas Austin – writing, production, arrangement
- Carlton Lynn – recording
- Doug Harms – recording assistance
- Dave Way – mixing
- Tim LeBlanc – mixing assistance
- Rick Sheppard – MIDI and sound design
- Herb Powers Jr. – mastering

== Charts ==
=== Weekly charts ===
Weekly chart performance for "Don't Let Me Get Me"
Chart (2002)	Peak position
Australia (ARIA)	8
Austria (Ö3 Austria Top 40)	10
Belgium (Ultratop 50 Flanders)	6
Belgium (Ultratop 50 Wallonia)	30
Canada Radio (Nielsen BDS)	2
Canada AC (Nielsen BDS)	23
Canada CHR/Top 40 (Nielsen BDS)	1
Croatia International Airplay (HRT)	1
Czech Republic (IFPI)	8
Denmark (Tracklisten)	4
Europe (Eurochart Hot 100)	9
European Radio Top 50 (Music & Media)	1
Finland (Suomen virallinen lista)	13
France (SNEP)	42
Germany (GfK)	10
Hungary (Rádiós Top 40)	5
Hungary (Single Top 40)	9
Ireland (IRMA)	5
Italy (FIMI)	6
Netherlands (Dutch Top 40)	6
Netherlands (Single Top 100)	11
New Zealand (Recorded Music NZ)	1
Norway (VG-lista)	7
Romania (Romanian Top 100)	6
Scottish Singles Sales (Official Charts)	4
Sweden (Sverigetopplistan)	5
Switzerland (Schweizer Hitparade)	10
UK Singles (Official Charts)	6
US Billboard Hot 100	8
US Adult Pop Airplay (Billboard)	16
US Dance Club Songs (Billboard) Remixes	31
US Dance Singles Sales (Billboard) Remixes	5
US Pop Airplay (Billboard)	1
US Rhythmic Airplay (Billboard)	30

=== Year-end charts ===
Year-end chart performance for "Don't Let Me Get Me"
Chart (2002)	Position
Australia (ARIA)	72
Austria (Ö3 Austria Top 40)	58
Belgium (Ultratop 50 Flanders)	54
Canada Radio (Nielsen BDS)	22
Europe (Eurochart Hot 100)	75
Germany (Media Control)	65
Ireland (IRMA)	45
Italy (FIMI)	30
Netherlands (Dutch Top 40)	46
Netherlands (Single Top 100)	80
New Zealand (RIANZ)	16
Sweden (Hitlistan)	25
Switzerland (Schweizer Hitparade)	46
UK Singles (OCC)	83
UK Airplay (Music Week)	22
US Billboard Hot 100	36
US Adult Top 40 (Billboard)	35
US Mainstream Top 40 (Billboard)	7
US Maxi-Singles Sales (Billboard)	17

== Certifications ==
Certifications and sales for "Don't Let Me Get Me"
Region	Certification	Certified units/sales
Australia (ARIA)	2× Platinum	140,000^{‡}
Canada (Music Canada)	Gold	40,000^{‡}
New Zealand (RMNZ)	Gold	15,000^{‡}
Sweden (GLF)	Gold	15,000^{^}
United Kingdom (BPI)	Gold	400,000^{‡}
United States (RIAA) Video single with "Family Portrait"	Gold	25,000^{^}
^{^} Shipments figures based on certification alone.^{‡} Sales+streaming figures based on certification alone.

== Release history ==
Release dates and formats for "Don't Let Me Get Me"
Region	Date	Format(s)	Label	Ref.
United States	February 18, 2002	Contemporary hit radio	Arista	
Australia	April 1, 2002	CD single	Arista; BMG	
Germany	May 13, 2002	CD single	Arista; BMG	
Sweden	May 13, 2002	CD single	Arista; BMG	
United Kingdom	May 13, 2002	CD single; cassette single	Arista; BMG	
Germany	June 17, 2002	DVD single	Arista; BMG	
