= Final cut privilege =

Right to decide how a film is released for public viewing

Final cut privilege (also known as final cutting authority) is the right or entitlement of an individual to determine the final version of a motion picture for distribution and exhibition. The final cut on a film can be held by film studios, studio executives, executive producers, film producers, directors, screenwriters, and sometimes actors. The authority can also be shared between any of the above parties.

== Background ==
Studios are typically reluctant to give final-cut rights to an individual who is not financially vested in the project and therefore often hold on to this authority or grant it to studio executives. In some instances, a studio may have a subsidiary that is a production company which retains final cut. Studio executives such as Kevin Feige for Marvel Studios and Kathleen Kennedy for Lucasfilm will often have final cut authority. Matt Damon, who was solely a producer on the 2016 film Manchester by the Sea, had final cut authority instead of the film's director, Kenneth Lonergan. Actors can also negotiate for final cut authority. The actor Kevin Costner had final cut on the 1999 film For Love of the Game due to the worldwide success of Dances with Wolves. Costner and the director Sam Raimi had creative disputes over the finished product. Although Universal Pictures sided with Raimi's changes, Costner's changes were made because he contractually held the authority.

== Directors ==
Directors will seek final cut authority for creative reasons; however, the right is usually only granted to established directors who have been determined by their record to be bankable, such as Christopher Nolan, Steven Spielberg, James Cameron, Peter Jackson, Quentin Tarantino, The Wachowskis or the Coen brothers. This authority is not absolute. If a director goes over budget, exceeds runtime, misses the production schedule, or otherwise does not stick to the agreed upon terms, they can lose final cut. Should the director no longer be an employee, the authority vested in the director is passed to a pre-determined individual that was approved by the director and the studio prior to production. Although all parties are obligated to meaningfully consult with each other on all aspects of the film, when it gets down to final cut, it can cause conflict, which usually occurs between the director and the studio.

Independent directors and those working outside of the major American film studios have other metrics to determine if final cut authority is granted to the director. For instance, in France, directors whose reputations are built on artistic merit, as opposed to bankability, frequently have final cut privilege for their films. In the United States there are directors that are considered acclaimed, but not necessarily bankable directors, such as Woody Allen, David Lynch, Alexander Payne and Terrence Malick, who enjoy final cut privilege.

When a film is released with a final cut made by someone other than the director, sometimes producers will subsequently release a director's cut of the film, which is a version of the film as the director would have cut it or more closely follows their vision of the project. A promise of a release of a director's cut can sometimes entice a director to join a project or help smooth over creative differences. These versions of a film can act as an additional marketing tool for film distribution, and often the term director's cut is used only for marketing purposes and has nothing to do with what the director actually wanted. Director's cuts are usually released via digital distribution, such as on DVDs or through streaming services.

== See also ==
- Artistic control, the same term when applied to musicians
- Auteur theory
- Alan Smithee
