= Missundaztood =

2001 studio album by Pink

Studio album by Pink
- Released: November 20, 2001
- Recorded: 2001
- Studios: DARP (Atlanta); Drive By (Los Angeles); The Enterprise (Burbank); Larrabee (Los Angeles); LP (Los Angeles); Pinetree (Miami Beach); Sony (Santa Monica)
- Genre: Pop rock
- Length: 55:12
- Label: Arista
- Producers: Linda Perry; Damon Elliott; Dallas Austin; Scott Storch; Marti Frederiksen; Richie Supa

Pink chronology
Can't Take Me Home (2000)	Missundaztood (2001)	Try This (2003)

Singles from Missundaztood
- 1. "Get the Party Started" Released: October 16, 2001; 2. "Don't Let Me Get Me" Released: February 18, 2002; 3. "Just Like a Pill" Released: June 10, 2002; 4. "Family Portrait" Released: September 16, 2002

Missundaztood (stylized as M!ssundaztood) is the second studio album by American singer Pink. It was released on November 20, 2001, by Arista Records. After the success of her debut album Can't Take Me Home (2000), Pink became dissatisfied with her lack of creative control and being pushed to solely sing R&B music. Aspiring to follow a more raw, rock-inspired musical direction, she began working on the album with Linda Perry after finding Perry's phone number in her makeup artist's phone book. Instead of relying on popular producers, Pink decided to collaborate with producers and artists who inspired her and enlisted help from Dallas Austin, Damon Elliott, Marti Frederiksen, and Scott Storch. Missundaztood also features guest appearances by Perry, Scratch, Steven Tyler, and guitarist Richie Supa.

The album was produced at a number of recording studios during 2001. Pink contributed significantly to the songwriting process, drawing on her experiences and vulnerabilities. The music contains introspective themes of personal insecurities, loneliness, self-identity, and family problems. Unlike the upbeat, R&B production of her previous album, Missundaztood is a pop rock record. It contains elements of a variety of other genres, including blues, metal, hip hop, new wave, and disco. Arista initially refused to put the album out, fearing that Pink's new direction would result in commercial failure, but she fought for her vision and eventually convinced the label that the risk was worth it.

To promote the album, Pink made televised performances and embarked on the Party Tour in 2002. Four singles supported Missundaztood, three of which peaked within the top 10 of the US Billboard Hot 100: "Get the Party Started", "Don't Let Me Get Me", and "Just Like a Pill". A worldwide commercial success, the album reached number 1 in Ireland and the top five on album charts in Austria, Germany, New Zealand, and the United Kingdom. It was certified quintuple platinum by the Recording Industry Association of America (RIAA) and received multi-platinum certifications in other countries. The album has sold 12 million copies worldwide, making it Pink's best-selling album and one of the best-selling albums of the 21st century.

A critical success, observers regarded Missundaztood as a significant progression from Can't Take Me Home and an artistic breakthrough for Pink. Most music critics praised the album's emotional depth and blending of styles; others appreciated Pink's vocal performances and songwriting. At the 45th Annual Grammy Awards, Missundaztood was nominated for Best Pop Vocal Album. Critics have praised Pink in retrospect for reinventing her music and increasing her creative control, calling Missundaztood distinguished and remarkable.

== Background ==
Pink released Can't Take Me Home, her debut studio album, in April 2000 on LaFace Records. The album is an R&B and dance-pop record with hip-hop influences. Produced by L.A. Reid and Babyface, it was a commercial success and sold over three million copies worldwide. Can't Take Me Home had a mixed critical reception, however, with many critics saying it sounded too similar to American girl groups Destiny's Child and TLC. Despite Can't Take Me Home's success, Pink felt dissatisfied and constrained by her lack of creative control and being marketed to a teen audience as an R&B singer. Her father, Jim Moore, said in an October 2000 MTV News interview that Pink expressed interest in experimenting and showcasing her versatility on her forthcoming album. She sought to create an album reflective of the musical influences with which she grew up, resembling the music of Annie Lennox and Method Man.

== Writing and recording ==
=== Sessions with Linda Perry ===
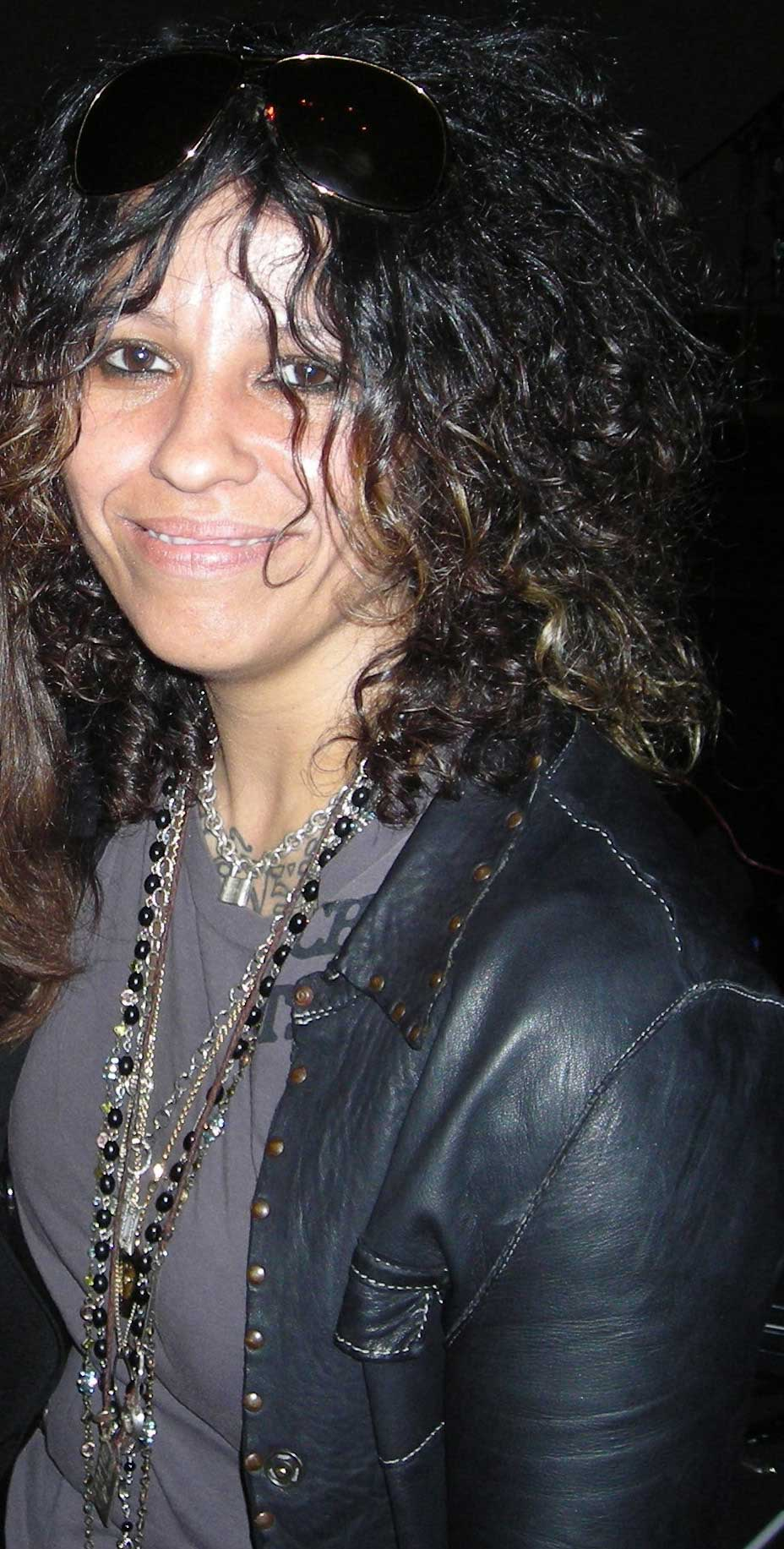
Linda Perry (pictured in 2008) co-wrote and produced a large portion of Missundaztood.

Pink stumbled upon the phone book of her makeup artist, Billy Brasfield, during a 2001 photo shoot for Teen. She discovered the number of Linda Perry, lead singer of the former American alternative rock band 4 Non Blondes. Pink cited Bigger, Better, Faster, More! (1992) as one of her favorite albums when she was growing up, and called Perry her "childhood idol". She noted Perry's number and called her, leaving a 10-minute message on her answering machine. According to Pink, the message was about "how much I loved [Perry] and how she owes me because I got arrested singing her music out of my window at 3:30 in the morning, and how I'm gonna stalk her if she doesn't return my call".

A few minutes later, Perry called Pink back and invited her to her house in Los Angeles. When Pink suggested writing a song with her, however, Perry was initially reluctant. In an interview with the San Francisco Chronicle, Perry said: "I told [Pink] 'I'm not hip [sic] at all. I make low-fi, garage-sounding classic rock records'" Pink responded, "I know — that's what I want". Afterward, Pink met Perry. Missundaztood's recording sessions began in Perry's home studio, (Note: Credited as LP Studios in the liner notes of Missundaztood.) with Perry at the piano asking Pink to express her feelings in a melody. Pink felt "petrified" and confused at first, since she was accustomed to a different creative process. (Note: During the recording of Can't Take Me Home, Pink sang songs which were already written and followed specific directions from producers.) As Perry began to play chords over a rough instrumental, Pink picked up a microphone and started to ad-lib. In about five minutes, they wrote and recorded "Eventually". Its lyrics were improvised, and Pink's vocals were recorded in one take. Perry described the song's creation as emotional, helping Pink to feel comfortable and understood during the recording process.

A week before meeting Pink, Perry worked on a song titled "Get the Party Started". Unfamiliar with new musical technology, Perry decided to call a friend and ask him about it. She then purchased equipment, including a Korg Triton synthesizer, an Akai MPC, a TASCAM DA-88 recorder, and Roland expansion cards. Perry originally had no goal in mind, and was "just figuring out what all [that] stuff does". She programmed her first beat, and made extensive use of a bass guitar, a horn sample, and looping "weird chords and sounds". Perry finished the song by including "every catch phrase you possibly could imagine", before laughing at the realization that she had written her first dance song. Aware of its commercial appeal, Perry unsuccessfully offered "Get the Party Started" to Madonna. She brought the song to Pink's attention soon after the Missundaztood sessions began, and Pink agreed to record it.

Pink moved into Perry's home for several months. They intended to write 25 songs for the album, and spent their time "kicking around ideas". The sessions in Perry's home studio yielded about 20 tracks in a month and a half, emphasizing introspection and emotional discovery. Working with Perry was an essential factor in Pink's decision to take artistic control of her album. She wanted to abandon the R&B "marketing concept" of Can't Take Me Home and capture reflections on her past, her vulnerabilities, and her insecurities. Pink considered the album's creation "amazing, liberating, inspiring", and felt that she and Perry had forged "five years of friendship in six months". About her working relationship with Pink, Perry said: "What happened was that we were able to open up to each other ... she completely abandoned what she was told she was supposed to be, and just became Alecia Moore".

=== Other collaborations ===
I went after people who inspired me, not the hot new record producer or anything. And it's all done very organically I mean, I'm old-school to the bone, and this is a very artist-driven record, not a producer-driven record.

— Pink, on taking more creative control of her music

After signing with LaFace in 1996, Pink met Dallas Austin. Austin generally disapproved of Pink's R&B direction, and his sessions for Can't Take Me Home were unproductive; however, she wanted to work with him again on her forthcoming album. They pursued a pop rock sound, and the material they had written took on an autobiographical form. Austin co-wrote and produced four songs on Missundaztood ("18 Wheeler", "Don't Let Me Get Me", "Just Like a Pill", and "Numb"), all of which have introspective lyrics. Austin encouraged Pink to be more daring in her songwriting: "When you're writing songs, you're not just writing a song, you're helping craft the attitude".

Pink worked with Scott Storch on "Family Portrait", a song which originated as a poem Pink wrote at age nine. The track explores her parents' divorce, and growing up in a dysfunctional family. Reflecting on these themes, Pink acknowledged how this affected her life was and decided to express her suffering through a song: "It makes me sad, but it also helped release some of my feelings ... Pain is not always a bad thing. It can be a learning thing". Another collaborator was Aerosmith lead singer Steven Tyler. One of Pink's musical inspirations, she met Tyler at a radio show in New York. They bonded quickly, and planned to record a song together. "Misery" had been written by Richie Supa and co-produced with Marti Frederiksen. Tyler brought the song to Pink, who loved it and recorded it with him. She described the collaboration as "an experience of a lifetime".

=== Record-label dispute ===
Pink had begun working with Perry on Missundaztood without the knowledge of her record label. After a few sessions, she played four songs (including "Get the Party Started") for producer L.A. Reid. Although he considered that song a lead single choice, Reid rejected most of the other material. Two weeks later, he and Pink met in Miami. Reid was concerned about Pink departing from her R&B sound, alienating an audience who was expecting another album like Can't Take Me Home. Her desire for more creative control met with resistance (since she was a new artist), but Reid failed to persuade Pink to record more R&B songs. After a vigorous dispute, he relented and gave Pink "the opportunity to fail". Reid called the completed album a "masterpiece", however: "There was no doubt that it would be a huge record". Pink discussed the danger of changing musical genres with the Los Angeles Times:

I knew the risk involved. I'd seen artists change styles and fail miserably, but I've also seen artists change and continue to do well. That's why Madonna has always been an inspiration for me. I told him I had faith in my ability and I was willing to take the chance. And I have so much respect for [Reid] because he turned around during that meeting. By the end, he said, "OK, let's do it".

== Musical style ==
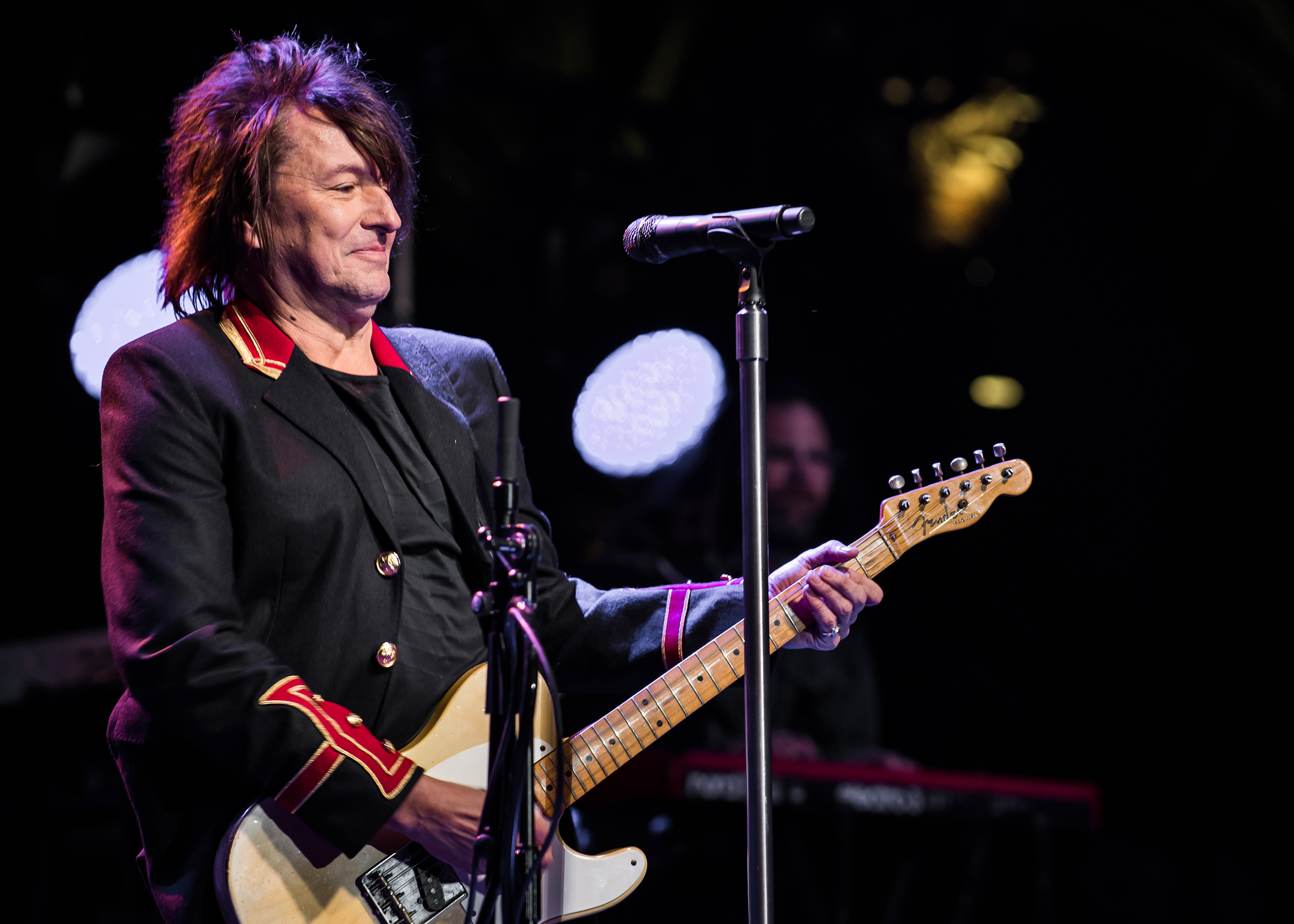
Richie Sambora of Bon Jovi (pictured in 2017) played a guitar solo on "Misery".

Missundaztood is a significant departure from the upbeat R&B style of Pink's debut album. It is primarily a pop rock album with an eclectic mix of musical styles. According to Ed Condran of The Philadelphia Inquirer, the album spans a variety of musical genres, from pop, rock, and disco to R&B, blues, and hip hop. Stephen Thomas Erlewine of AllMusic described its musical influences as "late-'80s, metal-spiked album rock, modern hip-hop and dance", with "dazzling modern pop production". An E! Online reviewer said that the album draws from "'80s new wave, alternative rock, unashamed radio pop, and R&B". MTV News journalist Jennifer Schonborn said that its fusion of styles has a "strangely" coherent quality. According to music writer Paul Lester, Missundaztood's diverse musical textures "shouldn't have fit together, but defied all odds and did." Kate Sullivan of Spin called Pink's direction "a rebellion against the producer-driven machinery that created her 2000 debut, Can't Take Me Home".

The album's songs are characterized by a "harder, edgier, rock sound". PopMatters' Jason Thompson wrote that Missundaztood's production melds "a funky ass bass line" with "some simple electric rhythm guitar and a spare synth line". "Don't Let Me Get Me" and "Just Like a Pill" are driven by rock-influenced electric guitars. "Get the Party Started" features vocodered vocals and elements of dance pop and new wave. The sixth track on the record, "18 Wheeler", has been cited by critics for its arena rock influences and rock instrumentation. Pink sings over a pop-R&B instrumentation combining a "snare" piano and strings on "Family Portrait". The blues rock ballad "Misery" has "gritty" vocals and a guitar solo by Bon Jovi's Richie Sambora. It is followed by "Dear Diary", with a trip hop beat. "Numb" is an electropop song with grunge metal elements which, according to Lester, resemble the music of Nirvana. The last track on Missundaztood, "My Vietnam", is a rock-neofolk ballad set to an acoustic guitar played by Perry. Towards the end of the song, a sonic interpolation of Jimi Hendrix's "Star Spangled Banner" is heard.

== Lyrics and themes ==
The lyrics on Missundaztood explore personal topics such as self-identity, loneliness, family issues, self-doubt, and rebellion. The album's title alludes to Pink's feeling of being misunderstood: "I say the wrong things, I tell the truth, which tends to get me in trouble, and I'm a very eclectic person, so I feel that's misunderstood, as well." ABC News called it "a guidebook to teenage angst told through the excruciating detail of Pink's childhood". Todd Burns of Stylus Magazine said that Pink "emerges as a conflicted and deeply troubled artist that is unafraid to confront her demons". The album's subjects were described by the music journalist Greg Kot as "autobiographical tunes that balance vulnerability with toughness". Sadie Jo Smokey of The Arizona Republic compared it to early 1990s music, "when women sang about issues and experiences". According to the Michigan Daily journalist Devon Thomas, Missundaztood's introspective lyrics reveal "a surprising sense of vulnerability".

The title track is an "optimistic and spunky" song. On "Don't Let Me Get Me", Pink describes her feelings of inadequacy and self-hatred. According to Kot, the song can be interpreted as "[Pink's] own abjection as a teenager who never found a peer group to belong to". Its lyrics also explore Pink's frustrations with the music industry: "L.A. told me, 'You'll be a pop star / All you have to change is everything you are.' / Tired of being compared to damn Britney Spears / She's so pretty, that just ain't me". Thompson described the song as an attempt "to break free from the image making machine". The next song, "Just Like a Pill", uses drug references as a metaphor for unhealthy relationships. The track also explores substance abuse and personal insecurities. "Get the Party Started" differs significantly from the album's primary introspection, suggesting "a fun, independent woman emerging to take charge".

"Family Portrait"
Personal themes are prevalent on Missundaztood, as demonstrated in "Family Portrait". Its autobiographical lyrics were inspired by the marital problems of Pink's parents and describe their constant fighting, which ended in divorce.

"Respect" has a female-empowerment message. On "18 Wheeler", Pink explores accepting abuse before saying that "nothing will keep her down". Family struggles are among the themes of "Family Portrait". The song's emotive lyrics describe the tempestuous relationship of Pink's parents, which led to their divorce. On "Lonely Girl", Perry asks Pink "Do you even know who you are? / Do you even know what you have?" Schonborn said that Pink has difficulty answering; the song is "fraught with uncertainty and doubt". The lyrics of "Dear Diary" explore disillusionment and abandonment, and "Numb" deals with mourning a defunct relationship. It is followed by "Gone to California", a socially-minded track. The album ends with "My Vietnam", which examines Pink's self-discovery. Its lyrics explore her father's military service in the Vietnam War and its aftermath on his and Pink's lives. According to Lester, the song uses "the image of battle as a metaphor for [Pink's] turbulent upbringing".

== Marketing and sales ==
Missundaztood was released on November 20, 2001, on Arista Records. The album was released in several European countries on January 28, 2002, with a different track order and the bonus track "Catch-22". Its deluxe edition was released on November 26, 2002, including the standard version of the album on CD and a DVD with music videos for "Family Portrait" and "Don't Let Me Get Me" and live performances of "Numb" and "Family Portrait" at Scala in London. The album was released on vinyl in October 2017.

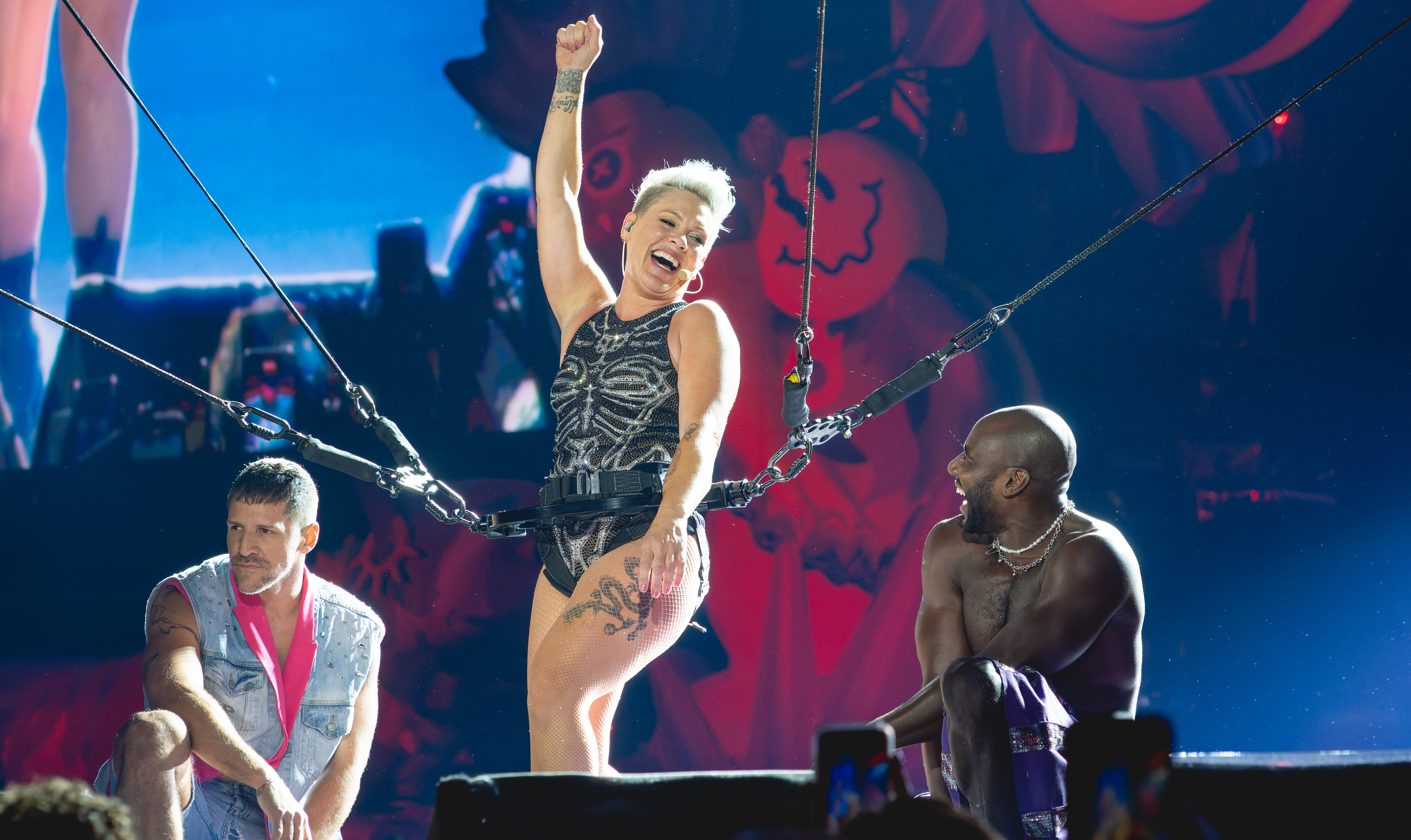
Pink performing the album's lead single, "Get the Party Started", at 2024's Summer Carnival

Four singles were released from the album: "Get the Party Started" on October 16, 2001; "Don't Let Me Get Me" on February 18, 2002; "Just Like a Pill" on June 10, and "Family Portrait" on September 16 of that year. All peaked in the first 20 entries of the Billboard Hot 100, with the first three peaking within the top 10. Pink promoted Missundaztood through her performances at the Billboard Music Awards, the Kids' Choice Awards, the MTV Asia Awards, and the MTV Video Music Awards. She also appeared on the Late Show with David Letterman, Saturday Night Live, and The Tonight Show with Jay Leno. European promotion included performances on Wetten, dass..? and at the MTV Europe Music Awards. Pink embarked on the Party Tour, her first headlining tour, in 2002 to support the album.

Missundaztood debuted at number eight on the US Billboard 200 chart, selling 220,000 copies for the week of December 8, 2001. It peaked at number six on January 26, 2002, and spent a total of 90 weeks on the chart. In the United States, Missundaztood ranked sixth among the best-selling albums of 2002, passing three million copies. On October 22, 2003, the album was certified quintuple platinum by the Recording Industry Association of America (RIAA) for shipments of five million copies. In Canada, Missundaztood peaked at number five on the Canadian Albums Chart and was certified quintuple platinum by Music Canada (MC) for shipments of 500,000 copies.

In the United Kingdom, it debuted at number four on the UK Albums Chart with first week sales of 22,000 copies. The album peaked at number two (behind Avril Lavigne's Let Go) for the week of January 18, 2003, almost a year after its release. It sold 1.88 million copies in the UK by February 2023, and was certified sextuple platinum by the British Phonographic Industry (BPI). The album topped the Irish albums chart for the week ending January 9, 2003, its best international charting. Missundaztood peaked highly in Scotland (number two); Austria, New Zealand and Norway (number four), and Germany, Iceland and the Netherlands (number five). It received multi-platinum certifications in Germany, Switzerland (double platinum); Australia, and New Zealand (quadruple platinum) and double gold certification in France and gold certification in Poland and Belgium. The album sold 12 million copies worldwide by November 2003, becoming Pink's best-selling album.

== Critical reception ==
Professional ratings
Aggregate scores
Source	Rating
Metacritic	72/100
Review scores
Source	Rating
AllMusic	4.5/5 stars
Blender	3/5 stars
Entertainment Weekly	A–
The Guardian	3/5 stars
Los Angeles Times	2/4 stars
NME	1.5/5 stars
Rolling Stone	3/5 stars
Slant Magazine	4.5/5 stars
Spin	6/10
The Village Voice	A

Missundaztood received generally positive reviews. At Metacritic, which assigns a normalized rating out of 100 to reviews from professional publications, the album received an average score of 72 based on 15 reviews. The Tampa Tribune's Cloe Cabrera described the album as "an edgy, rock-driven set", praising its focus on "loneliness, family discord and [Pink's] refusal to fit in". Erlewine praised the album's mixture of "bewildering" sounds and attitudes with painful subjects, adding that "there hasn't been a record in the mainstream this vibrant or this alive in a long, long time".

Thomas was impressed by Pink's "heartfelt and revealing" lyrics and "assured and confident" vocals, calling Missundaztood "an introspective charmer that shows the promise and versatility evident in a young and rising star." Smokey said that the album eschews the "slick pop-R&B diva image" of Can't Take Me Home in favor of a rock direction. For Billboard, Rashaun Hall called it "a rock-fused, hook-friendly set" and cited "Numb" and "Lonely Girl" as indicating Pink's versatility.

Thompson saw the album as "cover[ing] such a wide array of style and substance", and highlighted Pink's songwriting. Caroline Sullivan of The Guardian viewed it as "an unusually three-dimensional picture of growing up in a broken home", and found it "surprisingly good". Keri Callahan praised the album's honest lyrics and catchiness, which "echoes optimism and survival", in The Boston Globe. In Entertainment Weekly, Jim Farber said that Missundaztood "captures girlish confusion with greater accuracy and delight" than Alanis Morissette's Jagged Little Pill (1995) did, and Pink sounds "like Cyndi Lauper's long lost stepsister".

Sal Cinquemani of Slant Magazine praised the album's diverse sound, which "differentiates [Pink] from the pop pack", and called Pink's vulnerability "striking and seemingly more authentic" than Can't Take Me Home. For The Village Voice, Robert Christgau called the portrayal of "credible personal pain rooted in credible family travails" "a next step for a genre I never thought would take one". Rolling Stone critic Rob Sheffield called the album "the teen-pop In Utero", and appreciated Pink's expressive songwriting.

Other reviewers were less enthusiastic. Los Angeles Times writer Natalie Nichols unfavorably compared Missundaztood with Can't Take Me Home, referring to its "tendency to sound vaguely familiar". Alex Pappademas of Blender wrote, "Pink sees herself as a singer whose talent defies boundaries, but the melodic shortcomings of Missundaztood show that those eye-popping videos aside, she's no Madonna." NME's Jim Alexander gave the album 1.5 of five stars, criticizing its overall content.

=== Accolades ===
Missundaztood received nominations for Album of the Year at the 2002 Billboard Music Awards, Best Album at the 2002 MTV Europe Music Awards, Favorite Pop/Rock Album at the 2003 American Music Awards, and Best International Album at the 23rd Brit Awards. At the 45th Annual Grammy Awards in 2003, Missundaztood was nominated for Best Pop Vocal Album; its single, "Get the Party Started", was nominated for Best Female Pop Vocal Performance.

== Impact and legacy ==
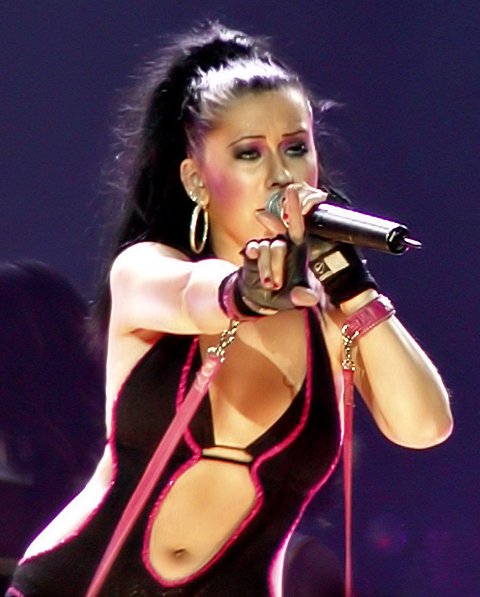
Missundaztood influenced Christina Aguilera (pictured in 2003) to work with Linda Perry on her 2002 album, Stripped.

Missundaztood's release coincided with the declining popularity of teen pop music. Sia Michel of Spin credited the album's success with the coming of age of former teen-pop fans and their growing interest in different types of music. For The Guardian, Dorian Lynskey attributed Pink's new popularity to the "lucrative and untapped market" of "teenage girls who may have liked Britney three years ago but now have a taste for low-key rebellion, the Osbournes and boys with tattoos". Most critics praised the album for its musical departure from contemporary music and altering the industry's perception of Pink as an artist. Jason Thompson called Missundaztood bold, and praised Pink for "breaking away from the stereotypes and misconceptions regarding pop stars". Robert Hilburn wrote for the Los Angeles Times that Pink's reinvention (and its potential commercial impact) was initially questioned, but was later "a move industry observers now applaud as brilliant". Idolator's Jon Reyes said that Missundaztood "defied expectations both in sound and themes". Barry Walters of Rolling Stone cited the album as one of "one of the most radical R&B to-rock transformations since Prince abandoned disco for a Dirty Mind [(1980)]".

In her 2019 book, White Negroes, Lauren Michele Jackson compared Pink's rebellious artistic transformation with Janet Jackson's Control (1986). According to Jackson, Pink's choice to leave the black-dominated R&B industry would "ultimately keep her apart from her peers". In a 2021 retrospective, Arielle Gordon of Stereogum said that Pink's opposition to her label's pressure to remain an R&B singer "somehow wrestled autonomy of her image and sound in an industry practically fueled by harnessing complete control of their young, primarily female stars." People editor Lanford Beard called Missundaztood "a career-shaping album", which helped establish Pink as a "prolific creator of 'autobiographical songs filled with attitude'". Pink said in a 2019 interview with Variety, "[Missundaztood] was a huge turning point in my life. But before it came out, I was being told that it's going to completely fail. Still, I was stoked to be given the opportunity to fail".

The album's success enhanced Perry's songwriting career, and she wrote songs with Alicia Keys, Courtney Love, and Gwen Stefani. Perry recalled that her life "took a complete turn" after the release of Missundaztood and its lead single, "Get the Party Started", and working with Pink helped her discover that "helping artists with their vision is kind of cool". Christina Aguilera cited Missundaztood as a contributing factor to enlisting Perry as a collaborators for her fourth studio album, Stripped (2002): "I wasn't a big fan of the Dallas Austin songs, but I really, really loved the Linda Perry songs. They had a really personal, real sense about them."

== Track listing ==
Missundaztood
No.	Title	Writer(s)	Producer(s)	Length
1.	"Missundaztood"	Pink; Linda Perry	Perry; Damon Elliott	3:36
2.	"Don't Let Me Get Me"	Pink; Dallas Austin	Austin	3:30
3.	"Just Like a Pill"	Pink; Austin	Austin	3:57
4.	"Get the Party Started"	Perry	Perry	3:11
5.	"Respect" (featuring Scratch)	Pink; Perry	Perry; Elliott	3:24
6.	"18 Wheeler"	Pink; Austin	Austin	3:44
7.	"Family Portrait"	Pink; Scott Storch	Storch	4:56
8.	"Misery" (featuring Steven Tyler)	Richie Supa	Marti Frederiksen; Supa	4:32
9.	"Dear Diary"	Pink; Perry	Perry	3:29
10.	"Eventually"	Pink; Perry	Perry	3:34
11.	"Lonely Girl" (featuring Linda Perry)	Perry	Perry	4:20
12.	"Numb"	Pink; Austin	Austin	3:07
13.	"Gone to California"	Pink; Perry	Perry; Elliott	4:33
14.	"My Vietnam"	Pink; Perry	Perry; Elliott	5:19
Total length:				55:12

International and vinyl editions
No.	Title	Writer(s)	Producer(s)	Length
15.	"Catch-22"	Pink; Perry	Perry; Elliott	3:51
Total length:				59:03

=== Notes ===
- International editions, excluding initial Australian and Japanese pressings, feature a different track order before track 15.
- Japanese Remix Plus edition pressings include a live performance of "Get the Party Started" at Scala in London, alongside Jacknife Lee and Maurice's Nu Soul mixes of "Just Like a Pill" and "Don't Let Me Get Me", respectively. Digital expanded edition uses the same track listing.
- Deluxe edition pressings feature the North American edition track listing, and include a bonus DVD containing the music videos for "Family Portrait" and "Don't Let Me Get Me", alongside live performances of "Numb" and "Family Portrait" at Scala in London.

== Credits and personnel ==
Credits are adapted from the album's liner notes.

=== Studios ===
- The Enterprise; Burbank, California (recording: track 1, 7; mixing: track 1, 4–5, 7, 9–11, 13–14; saxophone, harmonica, organ recording: track 13)
- Pinetree Studios; Miami Beach, Florida (recording: track 2–3, 6, 12)
- DARP Studios; Atlanta, Georgia (recording: track 2, 6, 12)
- Larrabee Studios North; North Hollywood, California (mixing: track 2–3, 6, 12; additional recording: track 4)
- LP Studios; Sherman Oaks, California (recording: track 4–5, 9–11, 13–14)
- Sony Studios; Santa Monica, California (additional recording: track 5)
- Drive By Studios; North Hollywood, California (recording: track 8)
- MF Studios; Monrovia, California (mixing: track 8)
- Hit Factory Mastering; New York City (mastering)

=== Musicians ===
- Linda Perry – guitars (track 1), instruments (track 4–5, 10–11, 13–14), drum programming (track 4–5, 9–11), background vocals (track 11), bass, Rhodes piano, synthesizer, additional drum programming (track 13)
- Pink – background vocals (track 1–6, 8–10, 12–14)
- Damon Elliott – bass, piano (track 1), drum programming (track 1, 5, 13), saxophone, harmonica (track 13)
- Dallas Austin – arrangement (track 2–3, 6, 12)
- Scratch – beatbox (track 5)
- Steven Tyler – background vocals (track 8)
- Richie Supa – arrangement, guitar solo, strings arrangement (track 8)
- Marti Frederiksen – arrangement, drums, bass, guitars, mellotron (track 8)
- Jim Cox – B3 organ, piano (track 8)
- Wayne Hood – keyboard, strings, strings arrangement, drums loop (track 8)
- Jimmy Z – saxophone, harmonica (track 13)
- David Seigel – organ (track 13)

=== Technicians ===
- Linda Perry – writer, production (track 1, 4–5, 9–11, 13–14), recording (track 4–5, 9–11, 13–14)
- Pink – writer (track 1–3, 5–7, 9–10, 12–14)
- Damon Elliott – production (track 1, 5, 13), recording (track 1), organ recording (track 13)
- Dave "Hard Drive" Pensado – mixing (track 1, 4–5, 7, 9–11, 13–14)
- Dave Guerrero – assistant mixing (track 1, 4–5, 7, 9–11, 13–14)
- Dallas Austin – writer, production (track 2–3, 6, 12)
- Carlton Lynn – recording (track 2–3, 6, 12)
- Doug Harms – assistant recording (track 2–3, 6, 12)
- Dave Way – mixing (track 2, 6, 12)
- Tim LeBlanc – assistant mixing (track 2, 6, 12)
- Rick Sheppard – MIDI, sound design (track 2–3, 6, 12)
- Kevin "KD" Davis – mixing (track 3)
- Bernd Burgdorf – additional recording (track 4–5), Pro Tools programming (track 4–5, 9–10)
- Johnathan Merritt – assistant additional recording (track 5)
- Scott Storch – writer, production (track 7)
- Wassim Zreik – recording (track 7)
- Oscar Ramirez – recording (track 7)
- Richie Supa – writer, production (track 8)
- Marti Frederiksen – production (track 8)
- Richard Chychki – recording (track 8)
- Herb Powers Jr. – mastering

=== Design ===
- Pink – executive production
- Antonio "L.A." Reid – executive production
- Joe Mama-Nitzberg – creative direction
- Jeff Schulz – art direction, design
- Terry Richardson – photography
- Patti Wilson – stylist
- Alberto Guzman – hairstyling
- Kristoff – hair coloring
- Devra Kinery – make-up
- Lee Taft – director programming

== Charts ==
=== Weekly charts ===
2001–2003 weekly chart performance
Chart	Peak position
Australian Albums (ARIA)	14
Austrian Albums (Ö3 Austria)	4
Belgian Albums (Ultratop Flanders)	12
Belgian Albums (Ultratop Wallonia)	26
Canadian Albums (Billboard)	5
Czech Albums (ČNS IFPI)	40
Danish Albums (Hitlisten)	10
Dutch Albums (Album Top 100)	5
European Top 100 Albums (Music & Media)	5
Finnish Albums (Suomen virallinen lista)	6
French Albums (SNEP)	17
German Albums (Offizielle Top 100)	5
Hungarian Albums (MAHASZ)	14
Icelandic Albums (Tónlist)	5
Irish Albums (IRMA)	1
Italian Albums (FIMI)	24
Japanese Albums (Oricon)	40
New Zealand Albums (RMNZ)	4
Norwegian Albums (VG-lista)	4
Polish Albums (ZPAV)	18
Scottish Albums (OCC)	2
Swedish Albums (Sverigetopplistan)	7
Swiss Albums (Swiss Hitparade)	7
UK Albums (OCC)	2
US Billboard 200	6

=== Year-end charts ===
2001 year-end chart performance
Chart	Position
Canadian Albums (Nielsen SoundScan)	60
Worldwide Albums (IFPI)	44

2002 year-end chart performance
Chart	Position
Australian Albums (ARIA)	21
Austrian Albums (Ö3 Austria)	11
Belgian Albums (Ultratop Flanders)	21
Belgian Albums (Ultratop Wallonia)	53
Canadian Albums (Nielsen SoundScan)	10
Danish Albums (Hitlisten)	25
Dutch Albums (Album Top 100)	18
European Top 100 Albums (Music & Media)	7
Finnish Albums (Suomen virallinen lista)	29
French Albums (SNEP)	98
German Albums (Offizielle Top 100)	10
Irish Albums (IRMA)	2
New Zealand Albums (RMNZ)	4
Swedish Albums (Sverigetopplistan)	15
Swedish Albums & Compilations (Sverigetopplistan)	19
Swiss Albums (Swiss Hitparade)	11
UK Albums (OCC)	2
US Billboard 200	4
Worldwide Albums (IFPI)	8

2003 year-end chart performance
Chart	Position
Australian Albums (ARIA)	86
Austrian Albums (Ö3 Austria)	49
Belgian Albums (Ultratop Flanders)	82
Belgian Albums (Ultratop Wallonia)	64
Danish Albums (Hitlisten)	82
Dutch Albums (Album Top 100)	39
French Albums (SNEP)	69
German Albums (Offizielle Top 100)	45
New Zealand Albums (RMNZ)	30
Swedish Albums (Sverigetopplistan)	88
Swiss Albums (Swiss Hitparade)	79
UK Albums (OCC)	44
US Billboard 200	66

2009 year-end chart performance
Chart	Position
Australian Albums (ARIA)	46

=== Decade-end charts ===
2000s decade-end chart performance
Chart	Position
Austrian Albums (Ö3 Austria)	27
UK Albums (OCC)	38
US Billboard 200	38

=== All-time charts ===
All-time chart performance
Chart	Position
Irish Female Albums (IRMA)	23
US Billboard 200	157
US Billboard 200 (Women)	43

== Certifications ==
Certifications and sales
Region	Certification	Certified units/sales
Australia (ARIA)	4× Platinum	280,000^{^}
Austria (IFPI Austria)	Platinum	40,000^{*}
Belgium (BRMA)	Gold	25,000^{*}
Brazil (Pro-Música Brasil)	Gold	50,000^{*}
Canada (Music Canada)	5× Platinum	500,000^{^}
Croatia (HDU)	Silver	
Denmark (IFPI Danmark)	3× Platinum	60,000^{‡}
Finland (Musiikkituottajat)	Gold	16,534
France (SNEP)	2× Gold	200,000^{*}
Germany (BVMI)	2× Platinum	600,000^{^}
Hungary (MAHASZ)	Gold	
Japan (RIAJ)	Platinum	200,000^{^}
Netherlands (NVPI)	Platinum	80,000^{^}
New Zealand (RMNZ) Physical sales	4× Platinum	60,000^{^}
New Zealand (RMNZ) Digital sales + streaming	Platinum	15,000^{‡}
Norway (IFPI Norway)	Platinum	50,000^{*}
Poland (ZPAV)	Gold	20,000^{*}
Sweden (GLF)	Platinum	80,000^{^}
Switzerland (IFPI Switzerland)	2× Platinum	80,000^{^}
United Kingdom (BPI)	6× Platinum	1,800,000 (Note: UK sales figure for Missundaztood as of February 2023)
United States (RIAA)	5× Platinum	5,000,000^{^}
Summaries
Europe (IFPI)	3× Platinum	3,000,000^{*}
Worldwide	—	12,000,000
^{*} Sales figures based on certification alone.^{^} Shipments figures based on certification alone.^{‡} Sales+streaming figures based on certification alone.

== Release history ==
Release dates and formats
Region	Date	Edition(s)	Format(s)	Label(s)	Ref.
United States	November 20, 2001	Standard	Cassette; CD; enhanced CD	Arista	
Australia	December 3, 2001	Standard	CD	BMG	
Japan	January 23, 2002	Standard	CD	BMG	
Germany	January 28, 2002	Standard	Enhanced CD	Arista	
Netherlands	January 28, 2002	Standard	Enhanced CD	Arista	
United Kingdom	January 28, 2002	Standard	Enhanced CD	Sony	
France	February 12, 2002	Standard	Enhanced CD	Arista	
Japan	November 6, 2002	Remix Plus	CD	BMG	
United States	November 26, 2002	Deluxe	CD+DVD	Arista	
Australia	October 6, 2017	Standard	Vinyl	Sony	
France	October 6, 2017	Standard	Vinyl	Sony	
United States	October 6, 2017	Standard	Vinyl	RCA; Legacy	
Germany	January 19, 2018	Standard	Vinyl	Sony	

== See also ==
- List of best-selling albums by women
- List of best-selling albums of the 21st century
- List of number-one albums of 2003 (Ireland)
- List of best-selling albums of the 2000s (decade) in the United Kingdom
