= Just Like a Pill =

2002 single by Pink

Single by Pink

from the album Missundaztood
- B-side: "M!ssundaztood"
- Released: June 10, 2002
- Studio: Pinetree (Miami Beach, Florida)
- Genre: Pop rock
- Length: 3:57
- Label: Arista
- Songwriters: Pink; Dallas Austin
- Producer: Dallas Austin

Pink singles chronology
"Don't Let Me Get Me" (2002)	"Just Like a Pill" (2002)	"Family Portrait" (2002)

Music video
- "Just Like a Pill" on YouTube

"Just Like a Pill" is a song by American singer Pink. It was written by Pink and Dallas Austin and produced by Austin for the singer's second studio album, Missundaztood. The lyrics of the song deal with getting out of painful relationships with a subtheme about drug abuse.

The song was released worldwide as the third single from Missundaztood in June 2002 and was a commercial success, peaking at number eight on the Billboard Hot 100 in the United States. It also performed well internationally, reaching number one on the UK Singles Chart and peaking within the top 10 in 12 additional countries.

== Background and composition ==
"Just Like a Pill" was written by Pink and Dallas Austin, who also produced and arranged the song. Pink said in an interview that the song shows "part of who I am", referring to her documented problems with drugs.

"Just Like a Pill" is set in the key of A major with a moderate pop-rock tempo in common time. The song follows a chord progression of A_{5}–F♯m–D_{5}–E_{5}, and Pink's vocals span from E_{3} to C♯_{5}.

== Reception ==
=== Critical response ===
The song was lauded by contemporary music critics. NME called it "the third best track off her killer last album". Drowned in Sound's Robert Luckett commented that it is "a fascinating record...this is a record with a[n] edge, a kind of pot boiling over at any moment, ready to go off at any time vibe." He also wrote "it obeys the pop industry's well-dusted rules for a hit." Stylus Magazine's Todd Burns, in his review of the album, compared "Just Like a Pill" to the other singles from the album, "Don't Let Me Get Me" and "Get the Party Started", writing "The guitars... sound much more integrated into the work and the overall song works far better."

The song was shortlisted by Digital Spy as a nominee for the best single of 2002, finishing third in the vote to Red Hot Chili Peppers' "By the Way" and Liberty X's "Just a Little".

=== Chart performance ===
In the UK, the song scored Pink her second number-one single in that country, whilst peaking at number two in Austria, Ireland and New Zealand, and within the top 10 in many countries across the world including Sweden, the Netherlands, Norway and Belgium. It peaked at number eight on the Billboard Hot 100. In Australia, the song was a radio-only single in hopes of rising album sales. Although it was a number-one radio hit, a physical release never eventuated; however, it did appear as the B-side to the Australian release of "Family Portrait".

== Music video ==
The video for "Just Like a Pill" was directed by Francis Lawrence for LaFace Records. The video is considerably different from Pink's previous videos. "Get the Party Started" and "Don't Let Me Get Me" were lighter in nature than the dark atmosphere of "Just like a Pill", which featured Pink wearing black outfits and wearing black hair. Commenting on the different style of video, Pink said: "This one's very dark and artsy, and I have black hair, which is very fun. I loved it. It's another part that I haven't concentrated on before."

In the first scene, Pink lies on the floor. In the chorus she sings in front of her band. She is also featured in another scene with white rabbits around her in a room, and in another scene, she is seen with an elephant. There are also scenes with Pink singing in front of and amongst various people. In the latter half of the video, she runs in a hall whilst lip-synching the song, before disappearing into a bright doorway atop a staircase at the conclusion of the video.

After the elephant scene, Pink decided to stop using animals for her videos. In an interview, she explained: "This poor elephant...a huge elephant, it's so cute, and I could see how painful it was for it to get down on its hands and knees, ... I didn't like it. I won't do that again. [...] No more animals."

== Track listings ==
- US CD single
1. "Just Like a Pill" (album version) – 3:57
2. "Just Like a Pill" (instrumental) – 3:52
3. "Don't Let Me Get Me" (Ernie Lake Ext. Club.vox) – 5:49
- Canadian CD single
1. "Just Like a Pill" (main) – 3:57
2. "M!ssundaztood" – 3:36
- UK CD and cassette single
1. "Just Like a Pill" (radio version) – 3:57
2. "Just Like a Pill" (Jacknife Lee Remix) – 3:46
3. "Get the Party Started" (live at La Scala) – 3:17
- European CD single
1. "Just Like a Pill" (radio edit) – 3:57
2. "Just Like a Pill" (Jacknife Lee Remix) – 3:46

== Credits and personnel ==
Credits are taken from the Missundaztood album booklet.

Studios

- Recorded at Pinetree Studios (Miami Beach, Florida)
- Mixed at Larrabee Studios North (North Hollywood, California)
- Mastered at Hit Factory Mastering (New York City)

Personnel

- Pink – writing, vocals, background vocals
- Dallas Austin – writing, production, arrangement
- Carlton Lynn – recording
- Doug Harms – recording assistant
- Kevin "KD" Davis – mixing
- Rick Sheppard – MIDI and sound design
- Herb Powers Jr. – mastering

== Charts ==
=== Weekly charts ===
Weekly chart performance for "Just Like a Pill"
Chart (2002)	Peak position
Austria (Ö3 Austria Top 40)	2
Belgium (Ultratop 50 Flanders)	5
Belgium (Ultratop 50 Wallonia)	19
Canada (Nielsen SoundScan)	4
Canada Radio (Nielsen BDS)	1
Canada AC (Nielsen BDS)	18
Canada CHR/Top 40 (Nielsen BDS)	1
Colombia (ASINCOL)	5
Croatia International Airplay (HRT)	2
Czech Republic (IFPI)	23
Denmark (Tracklisten)	10
Europe (Eurochart Hot 100)	3
Finland (Suomen virallinen lista)	19
France (SNEP)	29
Germany (GfK)	2
Greece (IFPI)	12
Hungary (Rádiós Top 40)	12
Hungary (Single Top 40)	6
Ireland (IRMA)	2
Netherlands (Dutch Top 40)	6
Netherlands (Single Top 100)	7
New Zealand (Recorded Music NZ)	2
Norway (VG-lista)	7
Poland Airplay (Music & Media)	1
Romania (Romanian Top 100)	17
Scottish Singles Sales (Official Charts)	1
Sweden (Sverigetopplistan)	5
Switzerland (Schweizer Hitparade)	6
UK Singles (Official Charts)	1
UK Airplay (Music Week)	4
US Billboard Hot 100	8
US Adult Pop Airplay (Billboard)	19
US Pop Airplay (Billboard)	2
US Rhythmic Airplay (Billboard)	34

2009 weekly chart performance for "Just Like a Pill"
Chart (2009)	Peak position
Australia (ARIA)	97

2024 weekly chart performance for "Just Like a Pill"
Chart (2024)	Peak position
Poland (Polish Airplay Top 100)	62

=== Year-end charts ===
2002 year-end chart performance for "Just Like a Pill"
Chart (2002)	Position
Austria (Ö3 Austria Top 40)	33
Belgium (Ultratop 50 Flanders)	60
Canada (Nielsen SoundScan)	29
Canada Radio (Nielsen BDS)	35
Europe (Eurochart Hot 100)	39
Germany (Media Control)	57
Ireland (IRMA)	41
Netherlands (Dutch Top 40)	30
Netherlands (Single Top 100)	77
New Zealand (RIANZ)	28
Sweden (Hitlistan)	73
Switzerland (Schweizer Hitparade)	50
UK Singles (OCC)	42
UK Airplay (Music Week)	28
US Billboard Hot 100	43
US Adult Top 40 (Billboard)	57
US Mainstream Top 40 (Billboard)	15

2003 year-end chart performance for "Just Like a Pill"
Chart (2003)	Position
US Adult Top 40 (Billboard)	88

== Certifications ==
Certifications and sales for "Just Like a Pill"
Region	Certification	Certified units/sales
Australia (ARIA)	2× Platinum	140,000^{‡}
Austria (IFPI Austria)	Gold	15,000^{*}
Canada (Music Canada)	Platinum	80,000^{‡}
Denmark (IFPI Danmark)	Gold	45,000^{‡}
Germany (BVMI)	Gold	300,000^{‡}
New Zealand (RMNZ)	Platinum	30,000^{‡}
Norway (IFPI Norway)	Gold	5,000^{*}
United Kingdom (BPI)	Platinum	762,000
United States	—	483,000
^{*} Sales figures based on certification alone.^{‡} Sales+streaming figures based on certification alone.

== Release history ==
Release dates and formats for "Just Like a Pill"
Region	Date	Format(s)	Label(s)	Ref.
United States	June 10, 2002	Contemporary hit radio	Arista	
United Kingdom	September 16, 2002	CD; cassette	Arista; BMG	
Denmark	September 30, 2002	CD	Arista; BMG	
Sweden	September 30, 2002	CD	Arista; BMG	

== See also ==
- List of number-one singles from the 2000s (UK)
