= You Make Me Sick =

2000 single by Pink

Single by Pink

from the album Can't Take Me Home
- Released: December 5, 2000
- Studio: Brandon's Way (Los Angeles)
- Length: 4:06
- Label: LaFace; Arista
- Songwriters: Brainz Dimilo; Anthony President; Mark Tabb
- Producers: Babyface; Brainz Dimilo; Anthony President

Pink singles chronology
"Most Girls" (2000)	"You Make Me Sick" (2000)	"Lady Marmalade" (2001)

Music video
- "You Make Me Sick" on YouTube

"You Make Me Sick" is a song by American singer Pink from her debut studio album, Can't Take Me Home (2000). It was written by Brainz Dimilo, Anthony President, and Mark Tabb, while production was helmed by Dimilo, President and Babyface. It was released as the third and final single from Can't Take Me Home on December 5, 2000, by LaFace Records and Arista Records.

A moderate chart success, it peaked at number 33 on the US Billboard Hot 100 and number nine on the UK Singles Chart. The accompanying music video for "You Make Me Sick" was filmed in late 2000 and was directed by Dave Meyers, whom Pink collaborated with previously on the first two music videos from Can't Take Me Home.

== Critical reception ==
AllMusic highlighted the song. Q magazine did the same.

== Chart performance ==
The song was a top-10 success in the United Kingdom, reaching number nine, and in New Zealand, reaching number 10. The song peaked at number 25 in Australia, where it sold over 35,000 copies and was accredited gold.

== Track listings ==
- UK CD single
1. "You Make Me Sick" (Radio Mix) – 4:12
2. "You Make Me Sick" (El B Remix) – 5:58
3. "You Make Me Sick" (Dub Conspiracy Remix) – 5:34
- UK cassette single
1. "You Make Me Sick" (Radio Mix) – 4:12
2. "You Make Me Sick" (Dub Conspiracy Remix) – 5:34
- US CD single
1. "You Make Me Sick" (DaMo's Radio Mix) – 3:57
2. "You Make Me Sick" (HQ2 Big Room Radio Vocal Mix) – 3:37
3. "You Make Me Sick" (HQ2 Big Room Club Vocal Mix) – 7:53
4. "You Make Me Sick" (Radio Mix) – 4:12
5. "You Make Me Sick" (Instrumental) – 4:30
- Australian CD single
1. "You Make Me Sick" (Radio Mix) – 4:12
2. "Most Girls" (Skribble & Anthony Acid Club Mix) – 8:54
3. "Most Girls" (Skribble & Anthony Acid Radio Mix) – 3:43
4. "Enhanced Section"
- European CD single
1. "You Make Me Sick" (Radio Mix) – 4:12
2. "You Make Me Sick" (Dub Conspiracy Remix) – 5:34
- German CD single
1. "You Make Me Sick" (Radio Mix) – 4:12
2. "You Make Me Sick" (El B Remix) – 5:58
3. "You Make Me Sick" (Dub Conspiracy Remix) – 5:34
4. "You Make Me Sick" (Album Version) – 4:10
5. "You Make Me Sick" (Instrumental) – 4:30

== Personnel ==
Personnel are adapted from the Can't Take Me Home liner notes.

- Pink: lead and background vocals
- Anthony President: writing, production, all instruments and drum programming
- Brainz Dimilo: writing, production, additional drum programming
- Mark Tabb: writing
- Babyface: production
- Sherree Ford-Payne: background vocals
- Paul Boutin, Edward Quesada: recording
- Manny Marroquin: mixing
- Victor McCoy: assistant engineering
- Ivy Skoff: production coordination

== Charts ==
=== Weekly charts ===
Weekly chart performance for "You Make Me Sick"
Chart (2001–2002)	Peak position
Australia (ARIA)	25
Australian Urban (ARIA)	8
Belgium (Ultratip Bubbling Under Flanders)	8
Belgium (Ultratip Bubbling Under Wallonia)	13
Europe (Eurochart Hot 100)	37
Germany (GfK)	88
Ireland (IRMA)	30
Netherlands (Dutch Top 40 Tipparade)	6
Netherlands (Single Top 100)	62
New Zealand (Recorded Music NZ)	10
Scottish Singles Sales (Official Charts)	24
UK Singles (Official Charts)	9
UK Dance (Official Charts)	7
UK Hip Hop/R&B (Official Charts)	5
US Billboard Hot 100	33
US Dance Club Songs (Billboard)	23
US Dance Singles Sales (Billboard) HQ2 remixes	2
US Pop Airplay (Billboard)	12
US Rhythmic Airplay (Billboard)	16

=== Year-end charts ===
2001 year-end chart performance for "You Make Me Sick"
Chart (2001)	Position
US Mainstream Top 40 (Billboard)	59
US Rhythmic Top 40 (Billboard)	65

2002 year-end chart performance for "You Make Me Sick"
Chart (2002)	Position
US Maxi-Singles Sales (Billboard)	19

== Certifications ==
Certifications for "You Make Me Sick"
Region	Certification	Certified units/sales
Australia (ARIA)	Gold	35,000^{^}
United States	—	93,000
^{^} Shipments figures based on certification alone.

== Release history ==
Release dates and formats for "You Make Me Sick"
Region	Date	Format(s)	Label(s)	Ref.
United States	December 5, 2000	Contemporary hit radio; rhythmic contemporary radio	LaFace; Arista	
Australia	December 11, 2000	Maxi CD	BMG	
Sweden	January 15, 2001	Maxi CD	BMG	
United Kingdom	January 15, 2001	Maxi CD	LaFace; Arista	
United States	January 16, 2001	Urban contemporary radio	LaFace; Arista	
Germany	January 29, 2001	Maxi CD	BMG	
France	March 13, 2001	Maxi CD	Arista	
