= Family Portrait (song) =

2002 single by Pink

Single by Pink

from the album Missundaztood
- B-side: "My Vietnam"
- Released: September 16, 2002
- Studio: The Enterprise (Burbank, California)
- Genre: R&B
- Length: 4:56; 3:49 (radio edit)
- Label: LaFace; Arista
- Songwriters: Alecia Moore; Scott Storch
- Producer: Scott Storch

Pink singles chronology
| "Just Like a Pill" (2002) | "Family Portrait" (2002) | "Feel Good Time" (2003) |

Audio sample
- file; help

Music video
- "Family Portrait" on YouTube

"Family Portrait" is a song by American singer-songwriter Pink from her second album, Missundaztood (2001). Co-written by Pink and Scott Storch and produced by Storch, the song is about relationships and her family that was about to fall to pieces, portraying the conflict through the eyes of her as a child. It was released as the album's fourth and final single on September 16, 2002. It peaked within the top 20 in both the U.K. and U.S. It was also Pink's fourth consecutive top-five hit from the parent album in New Zealand, peaking at number five.

== Background ==
Pink told Q magazine that the song got her into trouble with her mother. The singer commented: "She went to the National Enquirer. We laugh about it now, but it wasn't the best way to address family problems."

== Critical reception ==
The single received praise from critics. Paul Matthew from UKMIX gave the song 4 out of 5 stars, saying that it is strong, catchy and different from anything she had released to date. Bruce L. Thiessen praised the song's stripped down nature, stating that 'Pink has never been afraid to show her true colors. The haunting, yet urgently importuning nature of the music matches and magnifies the meaning. The intensity of every earnest guitar strum and run echoes the sense of longing for familial harmony expressed in the chorus. Pink's voice on “Family Portrait” further reflects the urgency underlying the song.' Malaimport from StudyMode.com gave Pink the credit for the song in his article, 'Pink positioned the audience to understand and accept her representations of pain and frustration was clear through the uses language choices and imagery devices such as repetition and use of strong and forceful words.'

== Music video ==
The music video stars P!nk and Kelsey Lewis and was directed by Sophie Muller. The video opens with P!nk lying in different positions on the bed; as she answers a phone call, she smashes a glass and Kelsey pops up. They are then shown in what looks like a kitchen. Kelsey tries to get the attention of P!nk, who is trying to cook. Then, the two are shown eating cereal on a couch while watching a commercial for a cereal named Pretty Happy. P!nk is seen opening a door, which a man comes in, and they sit at a table.

At the end of the video, the family in the TV commercial pulls Kelsey into it. The TV then shows P!nk singing alone. Finally, the family in the TV (now with the child Kelsey) gathers around and P!nk lies down on a pillow.

== Cultural impact ==
According to Pink's father, James Moore Jr., during an E! Entertainment's E! True Hollywood Story, this song has been unofficially named the national anthem for young kids who have been through the harsh effects of divorce of their parents: "I have got letters from parents thanking us from this song." The song, which she wrote and composed in collaboration with Scott Storch, was still going strong as of late April 2017, with millions of hits on YouTube and millions of albums sold from Missundaztood. "It took me a while to listen to 'Family Portrait' without getting emotional," Pink's mother told E! True Hollywood Story. Although the song addresses how Pink struggled through her parents' divorce, it is also addressed to kids, to encourage them to talk with their parents about how they feel about their divorce.

== Track listings ==
- UK CD single
1. "Family Portrait" (Radio Edit) – 3:50
2. "Family Portrait" (Album Version) – 4:56
3. "My Vietnam" (Live At La Scala) – 4:43
4. "Family Portrait" (Video) – 3:50
- European CD single
1. "Family Portrait" (Radio Edit) – 3:50
2. "Family Portrait" (Album Version) – 4:56
- Cassette
1. "Family Portrait" (Radio Edit) – 3:50
2. "My Vietnam" (Live At La Scala) – 4:43
- Australian CD single
1. "Family Portrait" (Radio Edit) – 3:49
2. "Just Like a Pill" (Jacknife Lee Mix) – 3:46
3. "Just Like a Pill" (Karaoke Version) – 3:52
- American DVD single
1. "Family Portrait" (Music Video) – 3:50
2. "Don't Let Me Get Me" (Music Video) – 3:30
3. "Numb" (Live at La Scala, London) (Audio) – 5:03
4. "Family Portrait" (Live at La Scala, London) (Audio) – 4:18

== Charts ==
=== Weekly charts ===
Weekly chart performance for "Family Portrait"
| Chart (2002–2003) | Peak position |
|---|---|
| Australia (ARIA) | 11 |
| Austria (Ö3 Austria Top 40) | 11 |
| Belgium (Ultratop 50 Flanders) | 8 |
| Belgium (Ultratop 50 Wallonia) | 19 |
| Canada Radio (Nielsen BDS) | 21 |
| Canada CHR/Top 40 (Nielsen BDS) | 4 |
| Croatia International Airplay (HRT) | 3 |
| Czech Republic (IFPI) | 8 |
| Denmark (Tracklisten) | 11 |
| Europe (Eurochart Hot 100) | 22 |
| Finland (Suomen virallinen lista) | 12 |
| France (SNEP) | 23 |
| Germany (GfK) | 8 |
| Hungary (Rádiós Top 40) | 24 |
| Ireland (IRMA) | 5 |
| Netherlands (Dutch Top 40) | 9 |
| Netherlands (Single Top 100) | 9 |
| New Zealand (Recorded Music NZ) | 5 |
| Norway (VG-lista) | 6 |
| Poland (PiF PaF) | 6 |
| Romania (Romanian Top 100) | 2 |
| Scottish Singles Sales (Official Charts) | 14 |
| Sweden (Sverigetopplistan) | 5 |
| Switzerland (Schweizer Hitparade) | 18 |
| UK Singles (Official Charts) | 11 |
| US Billboard Hot 100 | 20 |
| US Pop Airplay (Billboard) | 5 |

=== Year-end charts ===
2002 year-end chart performance for "Family Portrait"
| Chart (2002) | Position |
|---|---|
| Ireland (IRMA) | 72 |
| US Mainstream Top 40 (Billboard) | 94 |

2003 year-end chart performance for "Family Portrait"
| Chart (2003) | Position |
|---|---|
| Australia (ARIA) | 57 |
| Austria (Ö3 Austria Top 40) | 72 |
| Belgium (Ultratop 50 Flanders) | 72 |
| Belgium (Ultratop 50 Wallonia) | 88 |
| Croatia International Airplay (HRT) | 70 |
| France (SNEP) | 98 |
| Germany (Media Control GfK) | 72 |
| Ireland (IRMA) | 69 |
| Netherlands (Dutch Top 40) | 33 |
| Netherlands (Single Top 100) | 73 |
| Romania (Romanian Top 100) | 5 |
| Sweden (Hitlistan) | 34 |
| US Mainstream Top 40 (Billboard) | 31 |

== Certifications ==
Certifications for "Family Portrait"
| Region | Certification | Certified units/sales |
|---|---|---|
| Australia (ARIA) | 2× Platinum | 140,000^{‡} |
| Canada (Music Canada) | Gold | 40,000^{‡} |
| New Zealand (RMNZ) | Gold | 15,000^{‡} |
| United Kingdom (BPI) | Gold | 400,000^{‡} |
| United States (RIAA) Video single with "Don't Let Me Get Me" | Gold | 25,000^{^} |
^{^} Shipments figures based on certification alone.^{‡} Sales+streaming figures based on certification alone.

== Release history ==
Release dates and formats for "Family Portrait"
| Region | Date | Format(s) | Label(s) | Ref. |
|---|---|---|---|---|
| United States | September 16, 2002 | Contemporary hit radio | Arista | |
| Australia | November 18, 2002 | CD | Arista | |
| United Kingdom | December 9, 2002 | CD; cassette | LaFace; Arista | |
| Sweden | January 20, 2003 | CD | Arista | |
