= Most Girls (Pink song) =

2000 single by Pink

Single by Pink

from the album Can't Take Me Home
- B-side: "Hiccup"
- Released: June 6, 2000
- Studio: Brandon's Way (Los Angeles)
- Genre: R&B
- Length: 4:59 (album version); 4:10 (radio edit)
- Label: LaFace; Arista
- Songwriters: Damon Thomas; Babyface
- Producer: Babyface

Pink singles chronology
"There You Go" (2000)	"Most Girls" (2000)	"You Make Me Sick" (2000)

Music video
- "Most Girls" on YouTube

"Most Girls" is a song by American singer Pink, released as the second single from her debut album, Can't Take Me Home (2000). It was released on June 6, 2000, and, after spending 16 weeks on the US Billboard Hot 100 chart, peaked at number four on November 25. The song also reached number one in Australia, number two in Canada and New Zealand, and number five in the United Kingdom.

== Critical reception ==
Stephen Thomas Erlewine highlighted the song in his review of the album Can't Take Me Home for AllMusic. MTV Asia noted that the song was among the album's "edgy cuts" which had "everything it takes to top the charts". Q called the song a standout among the tracks from Can't Take Me Home.

== Track listings ==
US CD single

1. "Most Girls" (Skribble & Anthony Acid club mix) – 8:54
2. "Most Girls" (Skribble & Anthony Acid's Hard Girls Dub) – 7:32
3. "Most Girls" (album version instrumental) – 5:03
4. "Most Girls" (album version acappella) – 4:30
5. "There You Go" (Hani Mixshow Edit) – 5:32

US DVD single

1. "Most Girls" (video)
2. "There You Go" (video)
3. "Most Girls" (dance mix audio)

UK cassette single

1. "Most Girls" (radio edit) – 4:10
2. "There You Go" (Sovereign Mix) – 6:20

UK CD single

1. "Most Girls" (radio edit) – 4:10
2. "Most Girls" (X-Men vocal mix) – 4:53
3. "There You Go" (Sovereign Mix) – 6:20
4. "Most Girls" (enhanced video) – 4:31

European CD single

1. "Most Girls" (radio edit) – 4:10
2. "Most Girls" (X-Men vocal mix) – 4:53

Australian CD single

1. "Most Girls" (radio edit) – 4:10
2. "Hiccup" – 3:32
3. "There You Go" (video)
4. "Most Girls" (video)

== Credits and personnel ==
Credits are adapted from the liner notes of Can't Take Me Home.

Studios

- Recorded at Brandon's Way (Los Angeles)
- Mixed at The TracKen Place (Hollywood, California)
- Mastered at Powers House of Sound (New York City)

Personnel

- Pink – lead and background vocals
- Babyface – writing, production, keyboard, drum programming
- Damon Thomas – writing, background vocal arrangement
- Sherree Ford-Payne – background vocals
- Tavia Ivey – background vocals
- Paul Boutin – recording
- Manny Marroquin – mixing
- Victor McCoy – assistant engineering
- Ivy Skoff – production coordination
- Herb Powers – mastering

== Charts ==
=== Weekly charts ===
Weekly chart performance for "Most Girls"
Chart (2000)	Peak position
Australia (ARIA)	1
Australian Dance (ARIA)	1
Belgium (Ultratop 50 Flanders)	23
Belgium (Ultratip Bubbling Under Wallonia)	12
Canada Top Singles (RPM)	2
Canada Dance/Urban (RPM)	11 (Note: "Most Girls" reached number 11 when RPM ceased publication in November 2000.)
Europe (Eurochart Hot 100)	27
Iceland (Íslenski Listinn Topp 40)	8
Ireland (IRMA)	15
Netherlands (Dutch Top 40)	23
Netherlands (Single Top 100)	24
New Zealand (Recorded Music NZ)	2
Scottish Singles Sales (Official Charts)	17
Sweden (Sverigetopplistan)	44
UK Singles (Official Charts)	5
UK Dance (Official Charts)	2
UK Hip Hop/R&B (Official Charts)	1
US Billboard Hot 100	4
US Dance Club Songs (Billboard)	43
US Dance Singles Sales (Billboard)	1
US Hot R&B/Hip-Hop Songs (Billboard)	67
US Pop Airplay (Billboard)	2
US Rhythmic Airplay (Billboard)	1

=== Year-end charts ===
2000 year-end chart performance for "Most Girls"
Chart (2000)	Position
Australia (ARIA)	15
Iceland (Íslenski Listinn Topp 40)	76
New Zealand (RIANZ)	45
UK Singles (OCC)	134
US Billboard Hot 100	52
US Mainstream Top 40 (Billboard)	40
US Maxi-Singles Sales (Billboard)	10
US Rhythmic Top 40 (Billboard)	12

2001 year-end chart performance for "Most Girls"
Chart (2001)	Position
Canada (Nielsen SoundScan)	115
US Billboard Hot 100	97
US Mainstream Top 40 (Billboard)	53
US Maxi-Singles Sales (Billboard)	8
US Rhythmic Top 40 (Billboard)	81

== Certifications and sales ==
Certifications for "Most Girls"
Region	Certification	Certified units/sales
Australia (ARIA)	2× Platinum	140,000^{‡}
New Zealand (RMNZ)	Gold	5,000^{*}
United States	—	95,000
^{*} Sales figures based on certification alone.^{‡} Sales+streaming figures based on certification alone.

== Release history ==
Release dates and formats for "Most Girls"
Region	Date	Format(s)	Label(s)	Ref.
United States	June 6, 2000	Rhythmic contemporary radio	LaFace; Arista	
United States	July 25, 2000	Contemporary hit radio	LaFace; Arista	
Australia	August 28, 2000	Maxi CD	BMG	
Sweden	September 18, 2000	Maxi CD	LaFace	
United Kingdom	September 18, 2000	Maxi CD	LaFace	
United States	September 19, 2000	12-inch vinyl; maxi CD	LaFace; Arista	
France	September 25, 2000	Maxi CD	BMG	
New Zealand	October 9, 2000	CD; cassette	LaFace	
United States	November 21, 2000	DVD	LaFace; Arista	
Japan	April 25, 2001	DVD	BMG	
