= There You Go =

2000 single by Pink

Single by Pink

from the album Can't Take Me Home
- Released: January 18, 2000
- Studio: Triangle Sound (Atlanta)
- Genre: R&B
- Length: 3:26
- Label: LaFace; Arista
- Songwriters: Alecia Moore; Kandi Burruss; Kevin "She'kspere" Briggs
- Producer: Kevin "She'kspere" Briggs

Pink singles chronology
| "There You Go" (2000) | "Most Girls" (2000) |

Music video
- "There You Go" on YouTube

"There You Go" is a song by American singer Pink from her debut studio album, Can't Take Me Home (2000). It was co-written by Pink, Kevin "She'kspere" Briggs, and Kandi Burruss and was produced by Briggs, while Burruss produced the vocals. "There You Go" is a sassy, playful, and jittery R&B track with slinky instrumentation led by harpsichord-synthesizers. Based on personal experiences, the uptempo song is about a bad relationship that the protagonist has ended, but the ex-boyfriend wants her back.

The song was released as the lead single from Can't Take Me Home on January 18, 2000, by LaFace Records and Arista Records, serving as Pink's debut single. It received critical acclaim, with most critics comparing it favorably to other She'kspere productions from that time, including songs by Destiny's Child and TLC. Commercially, it reached the top of the Canadian Digital Songs Sales Chart and became a top ten hit in several countries, including Australia, New Zealand, the United Kingdom and the United States, where it reached Gold status the same year.

Pink collaborated with director Dave Meyers to film a music video for "There You Go," which depicts her getting revenge on her cheating boyfriend and debuted via The Box in late November 1999. The visuals were nominated for an MTV Video Music Award for Best New Artist. While Pink performed the song frequently during her first concert tours, her shift in sound, beginning with follow-up album Missundaztood (2001), led to the exclusion of "There You Go" from her set lists after 2013's The Truth About Love Tour.

== Background ==
"There You Go" was co-written by Pink along with Kevin "She'kspere" Briggs, and singer Kandi Burruss from R&B group Xscape for debut studio album, Can't Take Me Home (2000). Production on the song was helmed by Briggs, while Burruss served as a vocal producer. Reminiscent of other Briggs production from that time, it features a "fluttering sound effect," which is led by harpsichord-synthesizers and was described as "She'kspere's "trademark strums’n’stabs formula." As with most of her material on Can't Take Me Home, "There You Go" was largely inspired by "a bad relationship and [her] attitude." Pink told interviewer Lindzi Scharf in 2002: "When I wrote that, I was really angry at someone that I'm probably still angry with. I don't write love songs because I'm not in love. So I basically write about experiences that I've had or stuff that's embarrassed me or even something that gets on my nerves. Basically, writing is my vent. So, "There You Go" was like that. I'd always wanted to have the upper hand in that relationship and the only way I could have that was through the song." MTV News noted that "There You Go" "featured era-appropriate urban slang (such as "Sometimes it beez like that") and references to "bling-bling" and Hennessy."

== Critical reception ==
"There You Go" earned positive reviews from music critics, many of called it the standout track on parent album Can't Take Me Home, with others comparing it favorably to other She'kspere productions from the late 1990s to early 2000s. In his review of Can't Take Me Home, Lennat Mak from MTV Asia called the song one of the album's "edgy cuts" which had "the grooves needed to top the charts." NME critic John Mulvey found that Pink "manages some pretty excellent syncopated put-downs on "There You Go." The best track by far on her bland and avoidable debut album, the skills here come courtesy of ace writer/producer Kevin "She’kspere" Briggs, who bestows upon Pink his trademark strums’n’stabs formula heard to such witheringly brilliant effect on TLC's "No Scrubs"." Douglas Wolk from Rolling Stone was also positive, saying: "Her debut has one awesome single in "There You Go," whose wronged-woman sass is set to a stop-start groove so bling-bling it redeems a chorus that ends, "Sometimes it be's like that"."

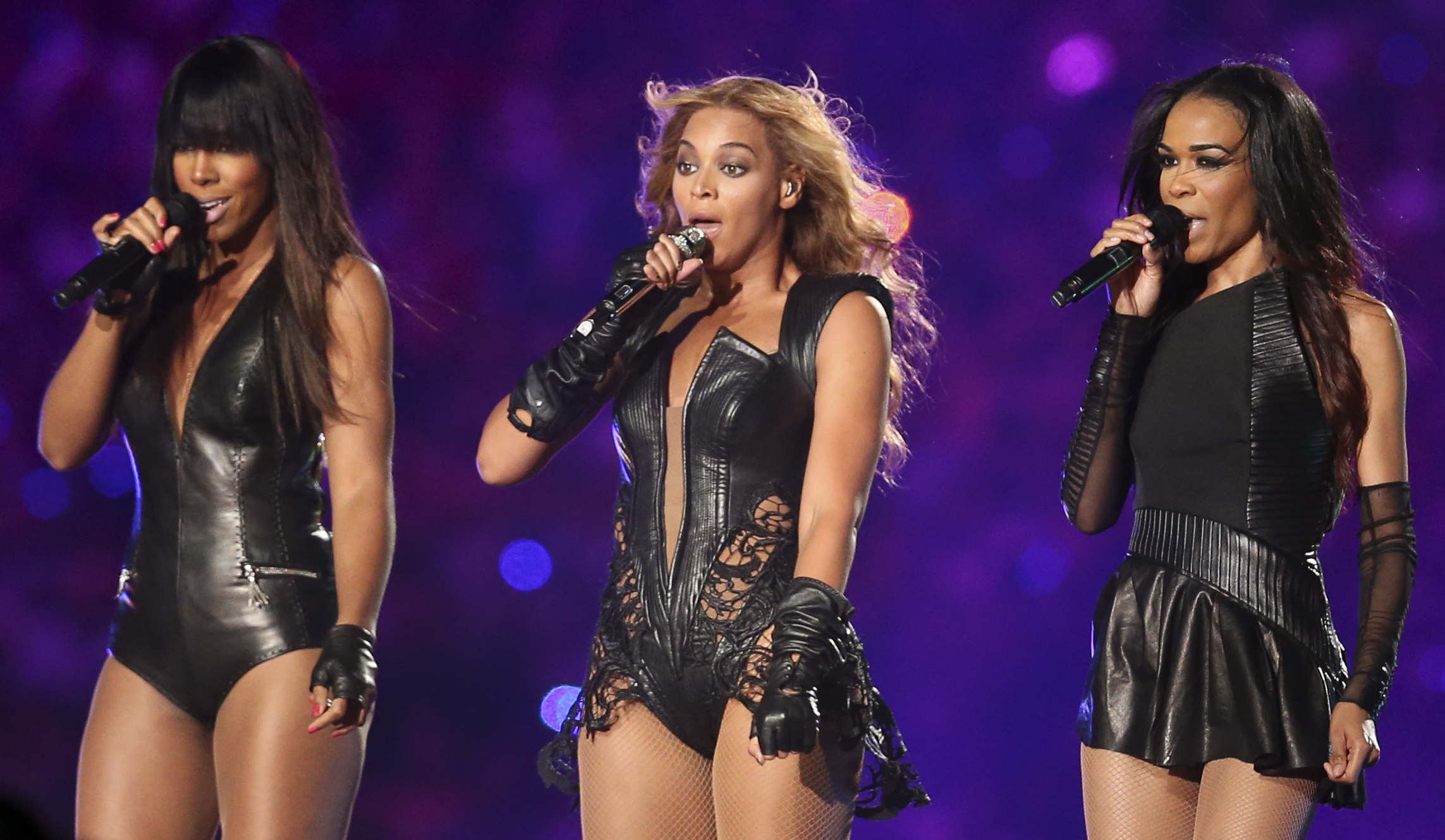
"There You Go" was favorably compared to other She'kspere productions such as Destiny's Child's "Bills, Bills, Bills" (1999).

Billboard editor Chucky Taylor called "There You Go" a "pretty nice effort. The tone is immediately set by the intro, which initially reminds one of the mega-smash "No Scrubs." With its uptempo groove, attitude, and universal lyries, "There You Go" could take Pink on a radio ride-it just depends on what else is out there. You see, while the record has some good elements and structure, it's more of a flavor record than one that is driven by its genuine hit potential." In another lukewarm review, Rob Brunner from Entertainment Weekly stated: "Briggs's "There You Go" is remarkably similar to his hits for Destiny's Child ("Bills, Bills, Bills") and TLC ("No Scrubs") but minus the vocal interplay that gives those tunes their punch." In her review of parent album Can't Take You Home, New Zealand Herald editor Russell Baillie wrote: "Like Kelis and others in the new breed of stroppy, crazy-haired divas, she's got an attitude to remember her by, at its best on the syncopated sass of single "There You Go"."

Writing for AllMusic, Stephen Thomas Erlewine called "There You Go" one of the highlights of Can't Take You Home. In a retrospective review, Justin Myers from the Official Charts Company described the song "a classic slice of Destiny's Child-inspired, useless man-dissing R&B. Even though the song was a vicious takedown, it had a fairly chilled vibe, but Pink was full of attitude and you could see that fiery personality was waiting to come out." In 2013, Complex ranked the song at number 11 on their list of "The Best R&B Songs by White Singers in the 2000s." In 2017, Billboard ranked "There You Go" ninth on its "Pink’s 20 Best Songs: Critic’s Picks" listing, with editor Patrick Crowley commenting: "Though she’s since settled into a rock-leaning sound, it’s undeniable that Pink’s swagger on this track matched that of club staples by Aaliyah ("Try Again"), Mya ("Case of the Ex") and Destiny’s Child ("Jumpin', Jumpin'") from the same year."

== Commercial performance ==
"There You Go" was released by LaFace Records and Arista Records as the lead single from Can't Take Me Home on January 18, 2000. It first entered the US Billboard Hot 100 chart on the issue dated March 4, at the twenty fifth spot. Six weeks later it peaked at number seven. Additionally, it peaked at number 2 on the US Dance/Club Songs and the Pop Songs charts, and number 4 on the Rhythmic radio chart. The same year, it was certified Gold by Recording Industry Association of America (RIAA) for shipments of over 500,000 copies in the United States. In late 2000, Billboard ranked it 15th on its Hot 100 year-end chart as well we as ninth on its US Rhythmic Top 40 year-end chart.

Elsewhere, the song peaked inside the top ten in the charts of eight more countries, including a second spot in Australia, where it eventually received a Platinum certification by Australian Recording Industry Association (ARIA) for shipments of 70,000 copies. It also gained a Platinum certification in the United Kingdom, where it debuted and peaked at number six on the UK Singles Chart and number two on the UK R&B Singles Chart, and went Gold in New Zealand, where it also reached number six on the New Zealand Singles Chart. "There You Go" also peaked at number six in Canada, where it moreover reached the top of the Canadian Digital Songs Sales Chart, and reached number eight on the Dutch Top 40.

== Music video ==
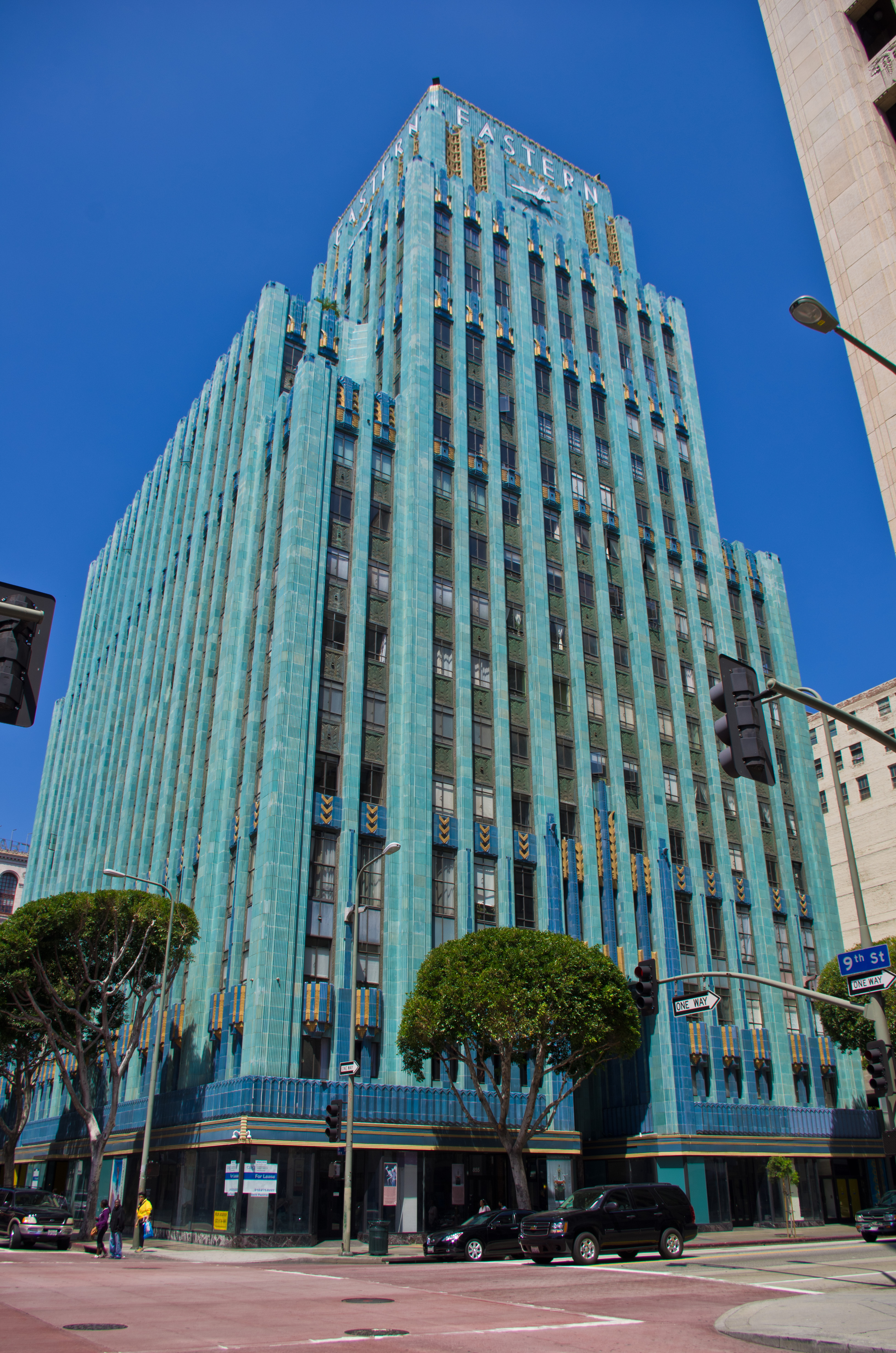
"There You Go" was filmed across the Eastern Columbia Building in Los Angeles.

The accompanying music video for "There You Go" was directed by Dave Meyers and debuted via The Box in late November 1999. Filmed in various locations throughout Los Angeles, their collaboration marked the beginning of several future videos the pair would work on together. Pink, who had "just started riding motorcycles," reportedly "almost crashed 85 times" during filming. In 2019, the singer confessed to being under the influence of marijuana while shooting the video, to the point she was unable to keep her eyes open, explaining to Billboard: "Dave Meyers kept coming up to me and saying, "Can you wait to smoke that next blunt before the beauty shot?" I was like, "What do you mean?". He was like, "I really want you to be able to open your eyes"."

In the music video, Pink's ex-boyfriend Mikey calls her asking for a ride and she reluctantly agrees to give him one. She hops on a motorcycle and rides to the top of a parking structure overlooking his apartment, where she calls him. She then accelerates her motorcycle, jumps off the last second, and watches as it soars off the building and crashes into his apartment window before exploding into flames, burning the armchair and the PlayStation Mikey was playing on earlier in the video. Pink then jumps into a car driven by a new guy, giving Mikey the middle finger as they drive off. Entertainment Weekly described the video by saying: "In the video for "There You Go" — her smash single — the piqued Pink freaks, sending a motorcycle crashing into [her boyfriend's] fab bachelor pad."

== Track listings ==
- US and European CD single
1. "There You Go" (album version) – 3:26
2. "There You Go" (instrumental) – 3:36
- Canadian and Australian CD single, European maxi-CD single
1. "There You Go" (album version) – 3:26
2. "There You Go" (Hani Num club) – 8:27
3. "There You Go" (Hani radio edit) – 3:33
4. "There You Go" (Hani MFF mix) – 8:39
5. "There You Go" (Hani Mix Show edit) – 5:32
- UK CD single
1. "There You Go" (album version) – 3:26
2. "There You Go" (Hani radio edit) – 3:33
3. "There You Go" (video) – 3:47
- UK cassette single
1. "There You Go" (album version) – 3:26
2. "There You Go" (Hani radio edit) – 3:33
3. "There You Go" (instrumental) – 3:36

== Credits and personnel ==
Credits adapted from the Australian CD single liner notes.

Studios

- Recorded at Triangle Sound Studio (Atlanta, Georgia, US)
- Mixed at Larrabee North Studios (Hollywood, California, US)
- Mastered at Powers House of Sound (New York City)

Personnel

- Pink – writing (as Alecia Moore), vocals, background vocals
- Kandi Burruss – writing, background vocals, vocal production
- Kevin "She'kspere" Briggs – writing, production, recording
- Andre Ware – recording
- Kevin "K.D." Davis – mixing
- Steve MacAuley – mixing assistance
- Herb Powers – mastering
- Darrick "D.L." Warfield – art direction
- Cherie O'Brien – creative coordination
- Fusion Designworks – artwork design
- Daniela Federici – photography
- Lysa Cooper – prop stylist
- Yellaka – image consultant
- Justin Henry – make-up
- Fredrick Parnell – hair

== Charts ==
=== Weekly charts ===
Weekly chart performance for "There You Go"
| Chart (2000) | Peak position |
|---|---|
| Australia (ARIA) | 2 |
| Belgium (Ultratop 50 Flanders) | 22 |
| Belgium (Ultratip Bubbling Under Wallonia) | 3 |
| Canada (Nielsen SoundScan) | 1 |
| Canada Top Singles (RPM) | 6 |
| Canada Dance/Urban (RPM) | 20 |
| Europe (Eurochart Hot 100) | 25 |
| Germany (GfK) | 65 |
| Iceland (Íslenski Listinn Topp 40) | 10 |
| Ireland (IRMA) | 19 |
| Netherlands (Dutch Top 40) | 8 |
| Netherlands (Single Top 100) | 10 |
| New Zealand (Recorded Music NZ) | 6 |
| Poland Airplay (Music & Media) | 6 |
| Scottish Singles Sales (Official Charts) | 16 |
| Sweden (Sverigetopplistan) | 26 |
| Switzerland (Schweizer Hitparade) | 37 |
| UK Singles (Official Charts) | 6 |
| UK Hip Hop/R&B (Official Charts) | 2 |
| US Billboard Hot 100 | 7 |
| US Dance Club Songs (Billboard) | 2 |
| US Hot R&B/Hip-Hop Songs (Billboard) | 15 |
| US Pop Airplay (Billboard) | 2 |
| US Rhythmic Airplay (Billboard) | 4 |

=== Year-end charts ===
Year-end chart performance for "There You Go"
| Chart (2000) | Position |
|---|---|
| Australia (ARIA) | 41 |
| Belgium (Ultratop 50 Flanders) | 97 |
| Iceland (Íslenski Listinn Topp 40) | 40 |
| Netherlands (Dutch Top 40) | 74 |
| New Zealand (RIANZ) | 14 |
| UK Singles (OCC) | 114 |
| UK Urban (Music Week) | 14 |
| US Billboard Hot 100 | 16 |
| US Hot R&B/Hip-Hop Singles & Tracks (Billboard) | 86 |
| US Mainstream Top 40 (Billboard) | 13 |
| US Rhythmic Top 40 (Billboard) | 9 |

== Certifications ==
Certifications for "There You Go"
| Region | Certification | Certified units/sales |
|---|---|---|
| Australia (ARIA) | Platinum | 70,000^{^} |
| New Zealand (RMNZ) Physical sales | Gold | 5,000^{*} |
| New Zealand (RMNZ) Digital sales + streaming | Gold | 15,000^{‡} |
| United Kingdom (BPI) | Silver | 200,000^{‡} |
| United States (RIAA) | Gold | 600,000 |
^{*} Sales figures based on certification alone.^{^} Shipments figures based on certification alone.^{‡} Sales+streaming figures based on certification alone.

== Release history ==
Release dates and formats for "There You Go"
| Region | Date | Format(s) | Label(s) | Ref. |
|---|---|---|---|---|
| United States | January 18, 2000 | Rhythmic contemporary radio | LaFace; Arista | |
| United States | February 15, 2000 | Contemporary hit radio | LaFace; Arista | |
| United States | March 21, 2000 | Urban contemporary radio | LaFace; Arista | |
| Germany | March 27, 2000 | Maxi CD | BMG | |
| Sweden | March 27, 2000 | Maxi CD | LaFace | |
| Australia | April 3, 2000 | Maxi CD | BMG | |
| France | April 17, 2000 | Maxi CD | BMG | |
| United Kingdom | June 5, 2000 | Cassette; maxi CD | LaFace | |
