= Artistic control =

Authority to decide how a final media product will appear

Artistic control or creative control is a term commonly used in media production, such as movies, television, music production, or some other cultural product. A person, or the studio or production company, with artistic control has the authority to decide how the final product will appear. In movies, this commonly refers to the authority to decide on the final cut. When a director does not have artistic control, the studio or production company that is producing the project commonly has the final say on production.

== Music ==
Artistic Control or creative control can differ widely within the music industry. Two categories that determine the amount of creative control an artist possesses are: Independent and Signed. The type of venture that a musician chooses can impact the future of their music and how it is released.

=== Independent artist ===
An independent artist produces and releases music without the additional support of a record label. Similar wording to that of an independent artist would include "indie" or independently produced. When an artist is independent the music that is produced is completely funded by them or the group in which they are a part of. If an artist chooses to remain independent they typically have complete control of the music that they create, their release schedule and the amount of content that is created. However, there are also cons to this approach due to the lack of funding and promotion of the music.

==== Pros ====
- 100% creative control
- Maintain 100% of profit
- Own the rights to their music

==== Cons ====
- Limited promotion
- Lack of budget or funding

=== Signed artist ===
A signed artist includes a musician that is contracted to a record label. Typical record labels include Universal Music Group, Sony Music Entertainment, and Warner Music Group. Artists that are signed to larger record labels are bind to a contract that dictates the amount, type, and demographic that the music caters to. Signed artist typically see a large budget and promotion but can be subject to a lack of artistic control.

==== Pros ====
- Influential gain
- Increased budget
- Planned marketing

==== Cons ====
- Lack or decrease in artistic control
- Decreased personal profits
- Binding contracts

== Film ==
In film (movies and television) the person that is in charge of creative control is the director. The director has control of the artistic attributes of the film, commonly having a large influence of the overall vision. Directors commonly work in tandem with screenwriters and adjust aspects of the film as filming continues. The director has control over a variety of aspects such as: lighting, hair and makeup, set design and wardrobe. They are typically the final say unless the producer has adjustments of their own. Once the movie or television show is finished filming, the director will begin editing and release a version of the film commonly known as a "directors cut". This is an alternate version of the film that contains different scenes, cuts and edits.

== Professional wrestling ==
In professional wrestling, the person that has ultimate creative control is almost always the promoter, who is responsible for advertising and putting together matches in which wrestlers perform, or the booker, who is responsible for scripting the promotion's storylines; often, they are the same person or both part of a management committee.

The most notable case of a wrestler who was known to have had complete contractual creative control over the storylines he was involved in is Hulk Hogan, whose 1998 contract with World Championship Wrestling (WCW) stipulated that he had "approval over the outcome of all wrestling matches in which he appears, wrestles and performs". Hogan's contractual control over his WCW storylines led to him walking out of – and eventually suing – the promotion in 2000, after he, former WCW president Eric Bischoff, and WCW head writer Vince Russo could not come to an agreement over the manner in which he would defeat Jeff Jarrett for the WCW World Heavyweight Championship at Bash at the Beach; after Hogan won the title, Russo appeared at ringside and lambasted Hogan, stripping him of the title and effectively firing him from the promotion. Hogan was also believed to have exercised creative control during his 2005–06 tenure in WWE and his 2009–13 tenure in Total Nonstop Action Wrestling.

After re-signing to the World Wrestling Federation (WWF; later, WWE) in 1996, Bret Hart was also granted "reasonable creative control" over the departure of his character in the event of the contract being terminated early; differing interpretations of the term "reasonable" led to the Montreal Screwjob, in which WWF officials conspired to, without Hart's prior knowledge, "screw" him out of the WWF Championship at Survivor Series in 1997, after Hart indicated his refusal to lose the championship specifically in his home country of Canada. Despite social media sentiment about various headlining wrestlers – most notably Mercedes Moné in All Elite Wrestling and Becky Lynch and Rhea Ripley in WWE – no wrestler is currently believed to have creative control, although most wrestlers are afforded input during the creative process as a matter of course.

== See also ==
- Andy Warhol Foundation for the Visual Arts, Inc. v. Goldsmith
- Artistic freedom
- Final cut privilege
- Freedom of expression
