= List of awards and nominations received by Pink =

Pink awards and nominations
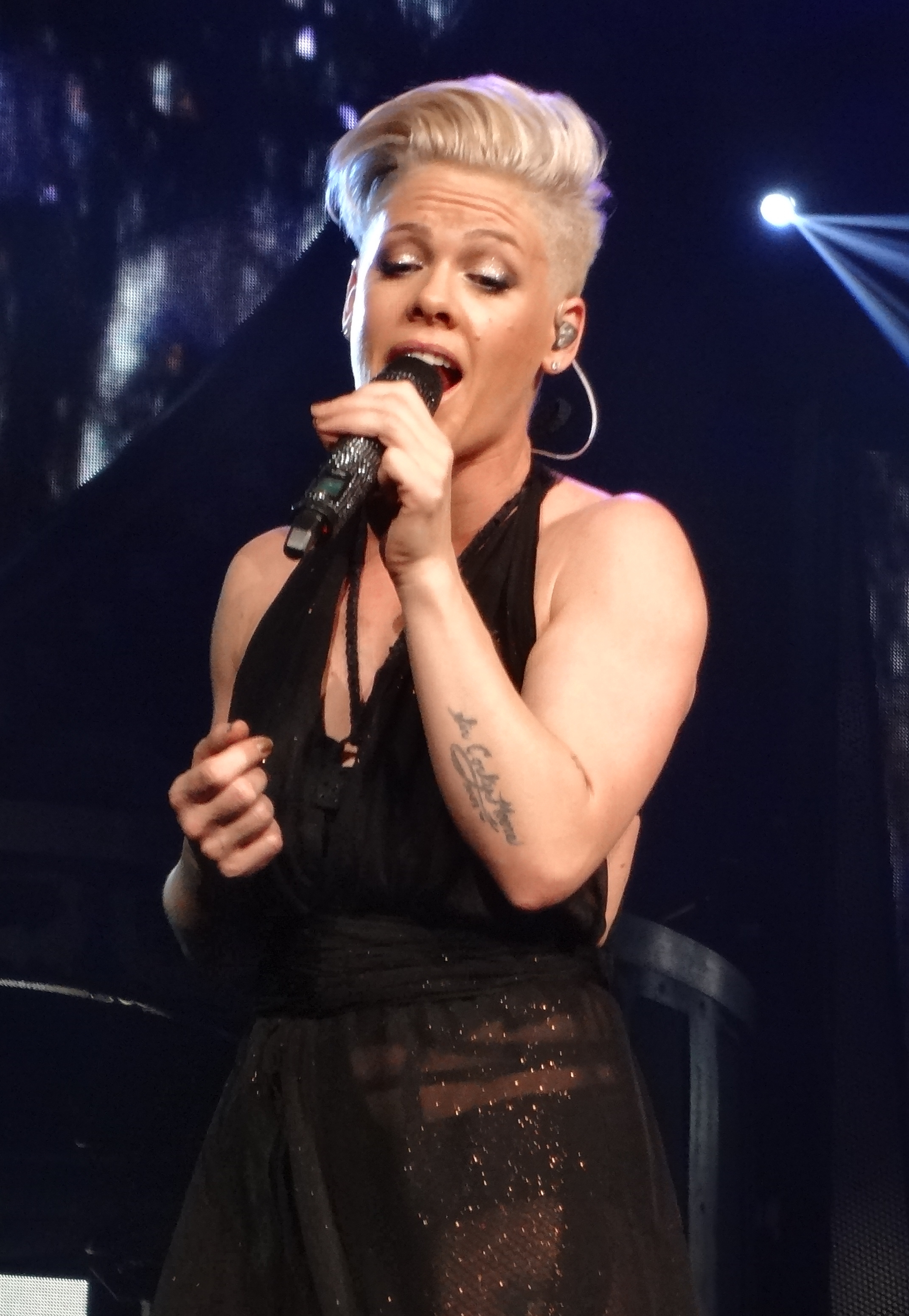
- Pink performing live during her Truth About Love Tour in April 2013
Awards and nominations
Award	Wins	Nominations
American Music Awards	0	5
Billboard	7	17
Brit	2	8
Echo	1	1
Grammy	3	21
MTV Australia	4	6
MTV Europe	2	11
MTV VMA	7	19
Teen Choice	1	12
ARIA Music Awards	1	3
BMI Awards	3	3
CMA Awards	0	1
Fonogram Awards	1	3
GAFFA Awards	0	2
Global Awards	0	3
Helpmann Awards	1	2
iHeartRadio Music Awards	1	4
Juno Awards	0	1
MTV Video Music Awards Latinoamérica	1	1
NRJ Music Awards	0	12
People's Choice Awards	1	12
Pollstar Awards	2	4
Q Awards	1	1

Totals (Note: Certain award groups do not simply award one winner. They acknowledge several different recipients, have runners-up, and have third place. Since this is a specific recognition and is different from losing an award, runner-up mentions are considered wins in this award tally. For simplification and to avoid errors, each award in this list has been presumed to have had a prior nomination.)
- Wins: 137
- Nominations: 251

This is a list of awards and nominations received by P!nk, an American singer and songwriter. She is winner of three Grammy Awards, a Daytime Emmy Award, four Billboard Music Awards, seven MTV VMA, two MTV EMA and two Brit Awards.

Active in the music industry since the 2000s, Pink published her debut album Can't Take Me Home (2000) being recognized with the Billboard Music Awards for Best New Female Artist. In 2001 Pink collaborated with Christina Aguilera, Lil' Kim and Mýa on "Lady Marmalade", which received several awards, including the Grammy Award for Best Pop Collaboration with Vocals and two MTV Video Music Awards. The same year she published her second album Missundaztood which received two Grammy Awards nominees. The single "Get the Party Started" won the MTV Europe Music Award for Best Song and two MTV Video Music Awards.

In 2003, Pink's third studio album Try This was promoted by the single "Trouble", which gave her second Grammy Award for Best Female Rock Vocal Performance. She also won a World Music Awards and the Brit Award for International Female Solo Artist. Three year after she published her fourth studio album I'm Not Dead which included the single "Stupid Girls", awarded with a MTV Video Music Awards. Her fifth studio album, Funhouse was published in 2008, promoted by the songs "Sober" and "So What", both nominated for the Grammy Award for Best Female Pop Vocal Performance.

In 2011, Pink won her third Grammy Award with "Imagine", recorded for Herbie Hancock's 2010 album The Imagine Project. In 2012 she published The Truth About Love, which featured "Just Give Me a Reason" with Nate Ruess. The project received three nominations at the Grammy Award: the album for Best Pop Vocal Album while the collaboration for Song of the Year and Best Pop Duo/Group Performance. With the song Pink won the MTV Video Music Award for Best Collaboration. For her 2016 collaboration with Kenny Chesney "Setting the World on Fire" she was nominated at the ACMusic Awards, CMA Awards, CMT Music Awards and won her second Billboard Music Award.

Pink's seventh studio album Beautiful Trauma was promoted by the single "What About Us", being nominated for two Grammy Awards. The following album Hurts 2B Human was promoted by "Walk Me Home" which won a BMI Pop Awards. Her ninth studio album Trustfall which included the song "Just Say I'm Sorry" with Chris Stapleton winner at the inaugural People's Choice Country Awards.

Pink also recorded film original songs "Bridge of Light" and "Just Like Fire". She composed and performed the theme song from The Ellen DeGeneres Show "Today's the Day" winning a Daytime Creative Arts Emmy Awards for Outstanding Promotional Announcement – Image. For her live performances she won three Pollstar Awards and two Billboard Live Music Awards. She released two documentary film-live album from the tours, including The Truth About Love Tour: Live from Melbourne (2013) and Pink: All I Know So Far (2021), received a nominations at the Grammy Award and Hollywood Critics Association TV Award.

Pink also received several honors and non-competitive awards. Billboard named her 2013 Woman of the Year at the Billboard Women in Music and honored her with the Billboard Icon Award and the Billboard Legend of Live. For her songwriting work she was named BMI President's Award and the SONA Warrior Awards. She was recognized with the Brit Award for Outstanding Contribution to Music, the MTV Michael Jackson Video Vanguard Award, the People's Champion Award and the IHeartRadio Music Award Icon Award.

== Awards and nominations ==
Award	Year	Work	Category	Result	Ref.
Academy of Country Music Awards	2017	"Setting the World on Fire" (with Kenny Chesney)	Vocal Event of the Year	Nominated	
Academy of Country Music Awards	2021	"One Too Many" (with Keith Urban)	Music Event of the Year	Nominated	
ALMA Awards	2002	Live at the 43rd Annual Grammy Awards	Outstanding Performance in a Music, Variety or Comedy Special	Won	
ALMA Awards	2002	"Lady Marmalade"	Outstanding Song in a Motion Picture Soundtrack	Won	
American Music Awards	2001	Herself	Favorite Soul/R&B New Artist	Nominated	
American Music Awards	2003	Herself	Favorite Pop/Rock Female Artist	Nominated	
American Music Awards	2003	Missundaztood	Favorite Pop/Rock Album	Nominated	
American Music Awards	2013	Herself	Favorite Pop/Rock Female Artist	Nominated	
American Music Awards	2013	Herself	Favorite Adult Contemporary Artist	Nominated	
American Music Awards	2018	Herself	Favorite Adult Contemporary Artist	Nominated	
American Music Awards	2019	Herself	Favorite Adult Contemporary Artist	Nominated	
American Music Awards	2019	Beautiful Trauma World Tour	Tour of the Year	Nominated	
AOL Instant Messenger	2006	Herself	AIM Best Musical Buddy	Won	
APRA Awards	2010	Sober"	International Work of the Year	Nominated	
APRA Awards	2019	"What About Us"	International Work of the Year	Nominated	
ARIA Music Awards	2011	Herself	Best International Artist	Won	
ARIA Music Awards	2013	Herself	Best International Artist	Nominated	
ARIA Music Awards	2018	Herself	Best International Artist	Nominated	
ARIA Music Awards	2019	Herself	Best International Artist	Nominated	
ARIA Music Awards	2021	"One Too Many" (with Keith Urban)	Song of the Year	Nominated	
ARIA Music Awards	2023	Herself	Best International Artist	Nominated	
Berlin Music Video Awards	2024	All Out Of Fight	Best Narrative	Nominated	
Billboard Music Awards	2000	Herself	New Female Artist of the Year	Won	
Billboard Music Awards	2000	Herself	Female Hot 100 Singles Artist	Nominated	
Billboard Music Awards	2000	Herself	Female Artist of the Year	Nominated	
Billboard Music Awards	2002	Missundaztood	Billboard 200 Album of the Year	Nominated	
Billboard Music Awards	2002	Herself	Female Artist of the Year	Nominated	
Billboard Music Awards	2014	Herself	Top Touring Artist	Nominated	
Billboard Music Awards	2017	"Setting the World on Fire" (with Kenny Chesney)	Top Country Song	Nominated	
Billboard Music Awards	2017	"Setting the World on Fire" (with Kenny Chesney)	Top Country Collaboration	Won	
Billboard Music Awards	2018	Beautiful Trauma	Top Selling Album	Nominated	
Billboard Music Awards	2020	Herself	Top Touring Artist	Won	
Billboard Music Awards	2021	Herself	Icon Award	Won	
Billboard Women in Music	2013	Herself	Woman of the Year	Won	
Billboard Music Video Awards	2001	"Lady Marmalade"	Director of the Year	Won	
Billboard Music Video Awards	2001	"Lady Marmalade"	Best Dance Clip of the Year	Nominated	
Billboard Live Music Awards	2013	Herself	Top Draw	Nominated	
Billboard Live Music Awards	2013	Herself	Top Boxscore	Won	
Billboard Live Music Awards	2013	Herself	Eventful Fans' Choice Award	Nominated	
Billboard Live Music Awards	2019	Beautiful Trauma World Tour	Tour of the Year	Won	
Billboard Live Music Awards	2019	Herself	Legend of Live	Won	
Blockbuster Entertainment Awards	2001	Herself	Favorite Female – New Artist	Won	
BMI Pop Awards	2003	"Don't Let Me Get Me"	Award Winning Songs	Won	
BMI Pop Awards	2004	"Just Like a Pill"	Award Winning Songs	Won	
BMI Pop Awards	2008	"U + Ur Hand"	Award Winning Songs	Won	
BMI Pop Awards	2008	"Who Knew"	Award Winning Songs	Won	
BMI Pop Awards	2010	"Please Don't Leave Me"	Award Winning Songs	Won	
BMI Pop Awards	2010	"So What"	Award Winning Songs	Won	
BMI Pop Awards	2010	"Sober"	Award Winning Songs	Won	
BMI Pop Awards	2012	"Raise Your Glass"	Award Winning Songs	Won	
BMI Pop Awards	2012	"Perfect"	Award Winning Songs	Won	
BMI Pop Awards	2014	"Just Give Me a Reason"	Award Winning Songs	Won	
BMI Pop Awards	2014	"Try"	Award Winning Songs	Won	
BMI Pop Awards	2015	Herself	BMI President's Award	Won	
BMI Pop Awards	2015	"True Love"	Award Winning Songs	Won	
BMI Pop Awards	2017	"Just Like Fire"	Award Winning Songs	Won	
BMI Pop Awards	2019	"Beautiful Trauma"	Award Winning Songs	Won	
BMI Pop Awards	2019	"What About Us"	Award Winning Songs	Won	
BMI Pop Awards	2020	"Walk Me Home"	Award Winning Songs	Won	
BMI Pop Awards	2023	"All I Know So Far"	Award Winning Songs	Won	
Brit Awards	2001	Herself	Best International Female Solo Artist	Nominated	
Brit Awards	2001	Herself	Best International Newcomer	Nominated	
Brit Awards	2003	Missundaztood	Best International Album	Nominated	
Brit Awards	2003	Herself	Best Pop Act	Nominated	
Brit Awards	2003	Herself	Best International Female Solo Artist	Won	
Brit Awards	2007	Herself	Best International Female Solo Artist	Nominated	
Brit Awards	2009	Herself	Best International Female Solo Artist	Nominated	
Brit Awards	2014	Herself	Best International Female Solo Artist	Nominated	
Brit Awards	2018	Herself	Best International Female Solo Artist	Nominated	
Brit Awards	2019	Herself	Outstanding Contribution to Music	Won	
British LGBT Awards	2018	Herself	Best Music Artist	Nominated	
Channel V Thailand Music Video Awards	2002	"Lady Marmalade"	Popular Duo/Group Video	Won	
Country Music Association Awards	2017	"Setting the World on Fire" (with Kenny Chesney)	Musical Event of the Year	Nominated	
CMT Music Awards	2017	"Setting the World on Fire" (with Kenny Chesney)	Collaborative Video of the Year	Nominated	
CMT Music Awards	2021	"One Too Many" (with Keith Urban)	Video of the Year	Nominated	
CMT Music Awards	2021	"One Too Many" (with Keith Urban)	Collaborative Video of the Year	Nominated	
Daytime Emmy Awards	2016	"Today's the Day"	Outstanding Promotional Announcement – Image	Won	
Echo Awards	2018	Herself	Best Female International Artist	Won	
Fonogram Awards	2004	Try This	Pop Album of the Year	Won	
Fonogram Awards	2013	The Truth About Love	Pop/Rock Album of the Year	Nominated	
Fonogram Awards	2018	"What About Us"	Pop-Rock Album or Voice Recording of the Year	Nominated	
GAFFA Denmark Awards	2006	Herself	Best Foreign Female Act	Nominated	
GAFFA Swedish Awards	2018	Herself	Best Foreign Solo Act	Nominated	
Gay and Lesbian Entertainment Critics Association	2018	"Beautiful Trauma"	Dorian Award for TV Musical Performance of the Year	Nominated	
Girls Choice Awards	2019	"Love Me Anyway" (with Chris Stapleton)	Most Empowering Song of the Year (Group or Duo)	Nominated	
Girls Choice Awards	2019	"Try"	Most Empowering Girl Power Anthem of the Decade	Nominated	
Global Awards	2018	"What About Us"	Best Song	Nominated	
Global Awards	2018	Herself	Best Female	Nominated	
Global Awards	2018	Herself	Mass Appeal Award	Nominated	
Global Awards	2020	"Walk Me Home"	Best Song	Nominated	
Global Awards	2023	Herself	Best Female	Nominated	
Global Awards	2023	Herself	Mass Appeal Award	Nominated	
Grammy Awards	2002	"Lady Marmalade" (with Christina Aguilera, Lil' Kim and Mýa)	Best Pop Collaboration with Vocals	Won	
Grammy Awards	2003	"Get the Party Started"	Best Female Pop Vocal Performance	Nominated	
Grammy Awards	2003	Missundaztood	Best Pop Vocal Album	Nominated	
Grammy Awards	2004	"Feel Good Time"	Best Pop Collaboration with Vocals	Nominated	
Grammy Awards	2004	"Trouble"	Best Female Rock Vocal Performance	Won	
Grammy Awards	2007	"Stupid Girls"	Best Female Pop Vocal Performance	Nominated	
Grammy Awards	2009	"So What"	Best Female Pop Vocal Performance	Nominated	
Grammy Awards	2010	"Sober"	Best Female Pop Vocal Performance	Nominated	
Grammy Awards	2010	Funhouse	Best Pop Vocal Album	Nominated	
Grammy Awards	2011	"Imagine" (with Herbie Hancock, India.Arie, Seal, Konono Nº1, Jeff Beck and Oumou Sangaré)	Best Pop Collaboration with Vocals	Won	
Grammy Awards	2011	Recovery (as featured artist)	Album of the Year	Nominated	
Grammy Awards	2012	"Fuckin' Perfect"	Best Pop Solo Performance	Nominated	
Grammy Awards	2013	The Truth About Love	Best Pop Vocal Album	Nominated	
Grammy Awards	2014	"Just Give Me a Reason" (featuring Nate Ruess)	Song of the Year	Nominated	
Grammy Awards	2014	"Just Give Me a Reason" (featuring Nate Ruess)	Best Pop Duo/Group Performance	Nominated	
Grammy Awards	2015	The Truth About Love Tour: Live from Melbourne	Best Music Film	Nominated	
Grammy Awards	2017	"Just Like Fire"	Best Song Written for Visual Media	Nominated	
Grammy Awards	2017	"Setting the World on Fire" (with Kenny Chesney)	Best Country Duo/Group Performance	Nominated	
Grammy Awards	2018	"What About Us"	Best Pop Solo Performance	Nominated	
Grammy Awards	2019	Beautiful Trauma	Best Pop Vocal Album	Nominated	
Grammy Awards	2022	"All I Know So Far"	Best Song Written for Visual Media	Nominated	
Guild of Music Supervisors Awards	2017	"Just Like Fire"	Best Song/Recording Created for a Film	Nominated	
Helpmann Awards	2004	Try This Tour	Best International Contemporary Concert	Nominated	
Helpmann Awards	2010	Funhouse Tour	Best International Contemporary Concert	Won	
Hollywood Critics Association TV Awards	2021	Pink: All I Know So Far	Best Streaming Docuseries, Documentary Television Movie, or Non-Fiction Series	Nominated	
Hollywood Music in Media Awards	2016	"Just Like Fire"	Best Original Song - Sci-Fi/Fantasy Film	Won	
Hollywood Music in Media Awards	2021	Pink: All I Know So Far	Best Music Documentary/Special Program	Nominated	
Hollywood Walk of Fame	2019	Herself	Included	Won	
Human Rights Campaign	2010	Herself	Ally for Equality Award	Won	
iHeartRadio Music Awards	2017	"Just Like Fire"	Best Song from a Movie	Nominated	
iHeartRadio Music Awards	2018	Herself	Female Artist of the Year	Nominated	
iHeartRadio Music Awards	2019	"A Million Dreams"	Best Cover Song	Nominated	
iHeartRadio Music Awards	2023	Herself	Icon Award	Won	
iHeartRadio Titanium Awards	2018	"What About Us"	1 Billion Total Audience Spins on iHeartRadio Stations	Won	
International Dance Music Awards	2009	"So What"	Best Pop Dance Track	Nominated	
Juice TV Awards	2001	"Lady Marmalade"	Best R&B Video	Won	
Juno Awards	2014	The Truth About Love	International Album of the Year	Nominated	
LOS40 Music Awards	2013	The Truth About Love	Best International Album	Nominated	
LOS40 Music Awards	2013	Herself	Best International Act	Nominated	
Meteor Ireland Music Awards	2009	Herself	Best International Female	Nominated	
MTV Australia Awards	2007	Herself	Female Artist of the Year	Won	
MTV Australia Awards	2007	I'm Not Dead	Album of the Year	Nominated	
MTV Australia Awards	2007	"U + Ur Hand"	Best Pop Video	Nominated	
MTV Australia Awards	2007	"Who Knew"	Download of the Year	Won	
MTV Australia Awards	2008	I'm Not Dead Tour	MTV Live Performer Award	Won	
MTV Australia Awards	2009	"So What"	Best Video	Won	
MTV Europe Music Awards	2001	"Lady Marmalade"	Best Song	Nominated	
MTV Europe Music Awards	2002	"Get the Party Started"	Best Song	Won	
MTV Europe Music Awards	2002	Herself	Best Pop	Nominated	
MTV Europe Music Awards	2002	Herself	Best Female	Nominated	
MTV Europe Music Awards	2002	Missundaztood	Best Album	Nominated	
MTV Europe Music Awards	2003	Herself	Best Pop	Nominated	
MTV Europe Music Awards	2003	Herself	Best Female	Nominated	
MTV Europe Music Awards	2006	"Stupid Girls"	Best Video	Nominated	
MTV Europe Music Awards	2008	"So What"	Best Video		
MTV Europe Music Awards	2008	"So What"	Most Addictive Track	Won	
MTV Europe Music Awards	2012	Herself	Best Female	Nominated	
MTV Europe Music Awards	2012	Herself	Worldwide Act North American	Nominated	
MTV Europe Music Awards	2013	Herself	Best Live	Nominated	
MTV Europe Music Awards	2018	Herself	Best Live	Nominated	
MTV Europe Music Awards	2019	Herself	Best Live	Nominated	
MTV Video Music Awards Latinoamérica	2002	Herself	Best Pop Artist — International	Won	
MTV Movie Awards	2004	Charlie's Angels: Full Throttle	Best Cameo	Nominated	
MTV Video Music Awards	2000	"There You Go"	Best New Artist in a Video	Nominated	
MTV Video Music Awards	2001	"Lady Marmalade"	Video of the Year	Won	
MTV Video Music Awards	2001	"Lady Marmalade"	Best Pop Video	Nominated	
MTV Video Music Awards	2001	"Lady Marmalade"	Best Video from a Film	Won	
MTV Video Music Awards	2001	"Lady Marmalade"	Best Dance Video	Nominated	
MTV Video Music Awards	2001	"Lady Marmalade"	Best Choreography in a Video	Nominated	
MTV Video Music Awards	2001	"Lady Marmalade"	Best Art Direction in a Video	Nominated	
MTV Video Music Awards	2002	"Get The Party Started"	Best Female Video	Won	
MTV Video Music Awards	2002	"Get The Party Started"	Best Pop Video	Nominated	
MTV Video Music Awards	2002	"Get The Party Started"	Best Dance Video	Won	
MTV Video Music Awards	2006	"Stupid Girls"	Best Pop Video	Won	
MTV Video Music Awards	2009	"So What"	Best Female Video	Nominated	
MTV Video Music Awards	2010	"Funhouse"	Best Direction	Nominated	
MTV Video Music Awards	2010	"Funhouse"	Best Editing	Nominated	
MTV Video Music Awards	2011	"Fuckin' Perfect"	Best Video with a Message	Nominated	
MTV Video Music Awards	2013	"Just Give Me a Reason" (featuring Nate Ruess)	Best Female Video	Nominated	
MTV Video Music Awards	2013	"Just Give Me a Reason" (featuring Nate Ruess)	Best Collaboration	Won	
MTV Video Music Awards	2013	"Just Give Me a Reason" (featuring Nate Ruess)	Best Editing	Nominated	
MTV Video Music Awards	2017	Herself	Michael Jackson Video Vanguard Award	Won	
MTV Video Music Awards	2018	"What About Us"	Best Pop	Nominated	
MTV Video Music Awards	2021	"All I Know So Far"	Best Visual Effects	Nominated	
MTV Video Music Awards	2023	"Trustfall"	Best Pop	Nominated	
MTV Video Music Awards Japan	2002	"Lady Marmalade"	Best Video from a Film	Won	
MTV Video Music Awards Japan	2002	Herself	Best Pop Artist	Nominated	
MTV Video Music Awards Japan	2004	"Feel Good Time"	Best Video from a Film	Won	
MTV Video Music Awards Japan	2010	"Please Don't Leave Me"	Best Pop Video	Nominated	
MTV Video Music Awards Japan	2013	"Try"	Best Choreography	Nominated	
Music Video Production Awards	2006	"Stupid Girls"	Best Make-Up	Nominated	
Music Video Production Awards	2006	"Stupid Girls"	Best Hair	Nominated	
Music Video Production Awards	2013	"Try"	Best Hair	Nominated	
Music Video Production Awards	2013	"Try"	Best Pop Video	Nominated	
Music Video Production Awards	2013	"Just Give Me a Reason"	Best Editing	Nominated	
Much Music Video Awards	2006	"Stupid Girls"	Best International Video- Artist	Nominated	
Much Music Video Awards	2011	"Raise Your Glass"	MuchMusic.com Most Watched Video	Nominated	
Much Music Video Awards	2013	"Try"	International Video of the Year- Artist	Nominated	
Much Music Video Awards	2013	Herself	Your Fave International Artist/Group	Nominated	
Nickelodeon Kids' Choice Awards	2001	Herself	Favorite Female Artist	Nominated	
Nickelodeon Kids' Choice Awards	2002	Herself	Favorite Female Artist	Won	
Nickelodeon Kids' Choice Awards	2002	"Get the Party Started"	Favorite Song	Won	
Nickelodeon Kids' Choice Awards	2003	Herself	Favorite Female Artist	Nominated	
Nickelodeon Kids' Choice Awards	2013	Herself	Favorite Female Artist	Nominated	
Nickelodeon Kids' Choice Awards	2018	Herself	Favorite Female Artist	Nominated	
Nickelodeon Australian Kids' Choice Awards	2007	Herself	Fave International Singer	Won	
Nickelodeon Australian Kids' Choice Awards	2008	Herself	Fave International Singer	Nominated	
Nickelodeon Australian Kids' Choice Awards	2009	Herself	Fave International Singer	Won	
NME Awards	2003	Herself	Worst Haircut	Nominated	
NME Awards	2003	Herself	Artist of the Year	Nominated	
NME Awards	2003	Herself	Best Solo Artist	Nominated	
NME Awards	2004	Herself	Best Solo Artist	Nominated	
No Kid Hungry Campaign	2023	Herself	National Champion Award	Won	
NRJ Music Awards	2003	Herself	Music Website of the Year	Nominated	
NRJ Music Awards	2003	Herself	International New Artist of the Year	Nominated	
NRJ Music Awards	2004	Herself	Best International Female Artist	Nominated	
NRJ Music Awards	2007	"Stupid Girls"	Video of the Year	Nominated	
NRJ Music Awards	2007	Herself	Best International Female Artist	Nominated	
NRJ Music Awards	2009	Herself	Best International Female Artist	Nominated	
NRJ Music Awards	2009	Funhouse	Best International Album	Nominated	
NRJ Music Awards	2011	Herself	Best International Female Artist	Nominated	
NRJ Music Awards	2013	Herself	Best International Female Artist	Nominated	
NRJ Music Awards	2014	Herself	Best International Female Artist	Nominated	
NRJ Music Awards	2017	Herself	Best International Female Artist	Nominated	
NRJ Music Awards	2018	Herself	Best International Female Artist	Nominated	
NRJ Music Awards	2019	Herself	Best International Female Artist	Nominated	
People's Choice Awards	2006	"Stupid Girls"	Favorite Pop Song	Nominated	
People's Choice Awards	2010	Herself	Favorite Female Artist	Nominated	
People's Choice Awards	2011	Herself	Favorite Female Artist	Nominated	
People's Choice Awards	2011	Herself	Favorite Pop Artist	Nominated	
People's Choice Awards	2013	Herself	Favorite Female Artist	Nominated	
People's Choice Awards	2013	Herself	Favorite Pop Artist	Nominated	
People's Choice Awards	2014	Herself	Favorite Female Artist	Nominated	
People's Choice Awards	2014	"Just Give Me a Reason" (featuring Nate Ruess)	Favorite Music Video	Nominated	
People's Choice Awards	2014	"Just Give Me a Reason" (featuring Nate Ruess)	Favorite Song	Nominated	
People's Choice Awards	2019	Herself	The Female Artist of the Year	Nominated	
People's Choice Awards	2019	Herself	People's Champion Award	Won	
People's Choice Awards	2019	Beautiful Trauma World Tour	The Concert Tour of the Year	Nominated	
People's Choice Country Awards	2023	"Just Say I'm Sorry" (with Chris Stapleton)	The Crossover Song of the Year	Won	
Pollstar	2007	Pink and Justin Timberlake	Most Creative Tour Package	Won	
Pollstar	2013	Herself	Major Tour of the Year	Nominated	
Pollstar	2013	Herself	Most Creative Stage Production	Won	
Pollstar	2018	Beautiful Trauma World Tour	Best Pop Tour	Nominated	
Pollstar	2019	Beautiful Trauma World Tour	Best Pop Tour	Won	
Pollstar	2019	Beautiful Trauma World Tour	Major Tour of the Year	Nominated	
Pollstar	2024	Summer Carnival	Pop Tour of the Year	Won	
Pollstar	2024	Malcolm Weldon and Pink	Road Warrior of the Year	Nominated	
Pop	2018	"What About Us"	Song Of The Year Award	Nominated	
Q Awards	2002	"Get The Party Started"	Best Video	Won	
Queensland Music Awards	2022	"One too Many" (with Keith Urban)	Highest Selling Single of the Year	Won	
Radio Music Awards	2001	"Lady Marmalade"	Song of the Year: Top 40-Pop Radio	Won	
Satellite Award	2011	"Bridge of Light"	Best Original Song	Nominated	
Silver Clef Awards	2026	Herself	Silver Clef Award	Won	
Smash Hits Poll Winners Party	2002	Herself	Best Female Solo	Won	
SONA Warrior Awards	2022	Herself	Honoree	Won	
Swiss Music Awards	2010	Funhouse	Best Pop/Rock International Album	Won	
Teen Choice Awards	2001	"Lady Marmalade"	Song of the Summer	Won	
Teen Choice Awards	2001	"Lady Marmalade"	Choice Music: Dance Track	Nominated	
Teen Choice Awards	2001	Herself	Choice Female Artist	Nominated	
Teen Choice Awards	2002	Herself	Choice Female Artist	Nominated	
Teen Choice Awards	2002	Missundaztood	Choice Music: Album	Nominated	
Teen Choice Awards	2002	"Get the Party Started"	Choice Music – Single	Nominated	
Teen Choice Awards	2003	Herself	Choice Female Artist	Nominated	
Teen Choice Awards	2007	"U + Ur Hand"	Payback Track	Nominated	
Teen Choice Awards	2013	Hersekf	Female Artist	Nominated	
Teen Choice Awards	2013	Hersekf	Summer Music Star: Female	Nominated	
Teen Choice Awards	2013	"Just Give Me a Reason" (featuring Nate Ruess)	Choice Love song	Nominated	
Teen Choice Awards	2016	Herself	Choice Summer Music Star: Female	Nominated	
Teen Choice Awards	2016	"Just Like Fire"	Choice Music: Song from a Movie of TV Show	Nominated	
TMF Awards (Belgium)	2001	"Lady Marmalade"	International Video of the Year	Won	
TMF Awards (Nederland)	2002	"Lady Marmalade"	Best Video of the Year	Won	
TMF Awards (Nederland)	2006	"Stupid Girls"	Best Video of the Year	Nominated	
UK Music Video Awards	2017	"What About Us"	Best Choreography in a Video	Nominated	
My VH1 Music Awards	2001	"Lady Marmalade"	Is It Hot in Here Or Is It Just My Video	Won	
My VH1 Music Awards	2001	"Lady Marmalade"	My Favorite Video	Won	
My VH1 Music Awards	2001	"Lady Marmalade"	There's No "I" In Team (Best Collaboration)	Nominated	
World Music Awards	2003	Herself	World Best Selling American Pop Female Artist	Won	
World Music Awards	2006	Herself	World's Best Selling Pop/Rock Artist	Nominated	
World Music Awards	2007	Herself	World's Best Selling Pop/Rock Artist	Nominated	
World Music Awards	2008	Herself	World's Best Selling Pop/Rock Artist	Nominated	
4Music Video Honours	2012	Herself	Best Girl	Nominated	
4Music Video Honours	2012	"Blow Me (One Last Kiss)"	Best Video	Nominated	
Žebřík Music Awards	2002	"Just Like a Pill"	Best International Song	Nominated	
Žebřík Music Awards	2002	Herself	Best International Female	Won	
Žebřík Music Awards	2003	Herself	Best International Female	Nominated	
Žebřík Music Awards	2004	Herself	Best International Female	Nominated	
Žebřík Music Awards	2005	Herself	Best International Female	Nominated	
