= Pink (singer) =

American singer and songwriter (born 1979)

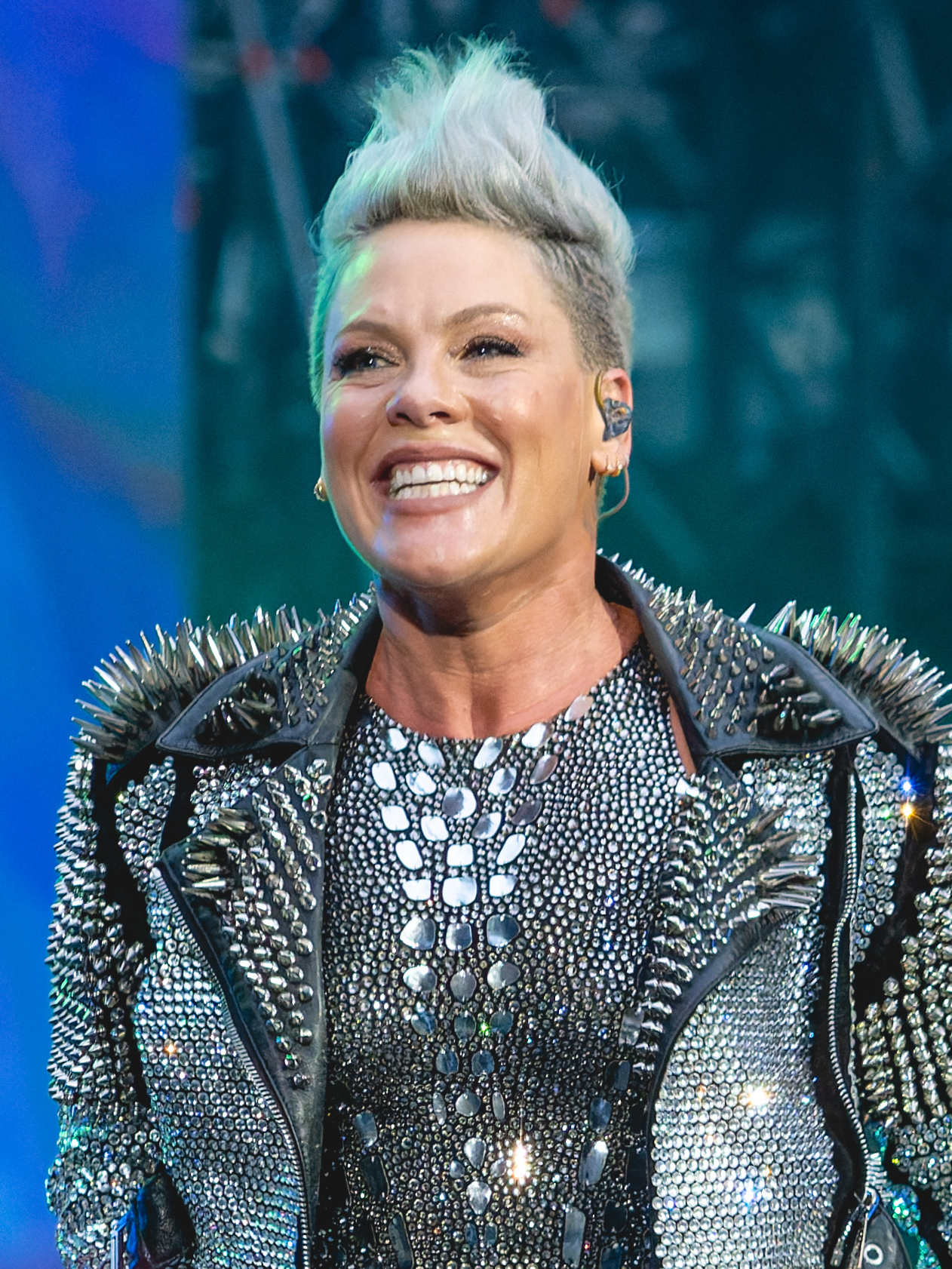
- Pink in 2024
- Born: Alecia Beth Moore; September 8, 1979 (age 47); Doylestown, Pennsylvania, U.S.
- Occupations: Singer; songwriter
- Years active: 1995–present
- Spouse: Carey Hart (m. 2006)
- Children: 2
- Awards: Full list
- Musical career
- Genres: Pop; pop rock; R&B
- Instrument: Vocals
- Works: Discography
- Labels: LaFace; Arista; Jive; RCA
- Member of: You+Me
- Formerly of: Choice
- Website: pinkspage.com

Alecia Beth Moore-Hart (born September 8, 1979), known professionally as Pink (stylized as P!nk), is an American singer and songwriter. She is known for her powerful vocal range and acrobatic stage presence.

After signing with LaFace Records in 1995, Pink began her career as part of the girl group Choice, although they disbanded without any major releases. As a solo artist, she released her R&B-influenced debut studio album, Can't Take Me Home (2000), before achieving wider recognition with her pop rock albums Missundaztood (2001), Try This (2003), I'm Not Dead (2006), and Funhouse (2008). She topped the US Billboard 200 with her next albums The Truth About Love (2012), Beautiful Trauma (2017) and Hurts 2B Human (2019). Her ninth studio album, Trustfall (2023), was promoted with the Summer Carnival tour, which became the second-highest grossing concert tour by a woman. Pink's catalog of high-charting singles include: "There You Go", "Most Girls", "Lady Marmalade", "Get the Party Started", "Don't Let Me Get Me", "Just Like a Pill", "Who Knew", "U + Ur Hand", "So What", "Raise Your Glass", and "Just Give Me a Reason".

Pink has sold more than 135 million records worldwide, making her one of the world's best-selling music artists. Pink is the most-played female solo artist in the UK during the 21st century, while Billboard named Pink the Pop Songs Artist of the 2000s Decade. Her accolades include three Grammy Awards, two Brit Awards, a Daytime Emmy Award, seven MTV Video Music Awards, and two MTV Europe Music Awards. At the 63rd BMI Pop Awards, she received the BMI President's Award for "her outstanding achievement in songwriting and global impact on pop culture and the entertainment industry", and was honored with the People's Champion Award, the iHeartRadio Music Award Icon Award. Billboard named Pink the 2013 Woman of the Year at the Billboard Women in Music and honored her with the Billboard Icon Award and the Billboard Legend of Live. VH1 ranked her 10th on its list of the 100 Greatest Women in Music. In 2026, Pink was nominated for the Rock and Roll Hall of Fame.

== Early life and family ==
Alecia Beth Moore was born on September 8, 1979, in Doylestown, Pennsylvania, to emergency room nurse Judith Moore (née Kugel) and insurance salesman James Moore. She has described herself as an "Irish-German-Lithuanian Jew", and her mother is Jewish. Although a healthy baby, she developed asthma that plagued her through her early years. When Pink was a toddler, her parents began having marital problems; they divorced before she was 10.

Pink trained as a competitive gymnast between the ages 4 and 12. She attended Central Bucks High School West. In high school, Pink joined her first band, Middleground, but it disbanded upon losing a Battle of the Bands competition. As a teenager, she wrote lyrics as an outlet for her feelings, and her mother commented, "Her initial writings were always very introspective. Some of it was very black, and very deep, almost worrisome."

Pink began performing in Philadelphia clubs when she was about 14 years old. She adopted her nickname "Pink" as her stage name around this time. She has given different explanations about how she came to be given that nickname, which she has had since she was a child. At 14, she was convinced to audition to become a member of the all-female group Basic Instinct, and earned a spot in the lineup. Ultimately, the group disbanded without releasing any material.

== Career ==
=== 1995–1998: Career beginnings ===
At 15, Pink and two other teenage girls, Sharon Flanagan and Chrissy Conway, formed the R&B group Choice. A copy of their first song, "Key to My Heart", was sent to LaFace Records in Atlanta, Georgia, where L.A. Reid overheard it and arranged for the group to fly there so he could see them perform. Afterward, he signed them to a recording contract with the label. Since the three girls were under 18 at the time, their parents had to cosign the contract. The group relocated to the label's then-headquarters in Atlanta to record an album. Despite it failing to see a commercial release, their song "Key to My Heart" appeared on the soundtrack to the 1996 film Kazaam. During a Christmas party, Reid gave Pink an ultimatum: "go solo or go home." Choice subsequently disbanded in 1998.

=== 1999–2002: Can't Take Me Home and Missundaztood ===
After Choice disbanded, Pink signed a recording contract with LaFace Records and began working on her first solo album with producers such as Babyface, Kandi Burruss and Tricky Stewart. Her first solo single, "There You Go", was released in February 2000 and became her first Top 10 hit on the Billboard Hot 100 chart, where it peaked at No. 7. Internationally, the song also charted inside the Top 10 in Australia, New Zealand, and the United Kingdom. In April, Pink's album, Can't Take Me Home, was released to commercial success. It peaked at No. 26 on the Billboard 200 chart and was certified double platinum by the Recording Industry Association of America (RIAA) for two million units shipped in the U.S. It also went platinum in the United Kingdom and multi-platinum in Australia and Canada, while selling more than four million copies worldwide. Critical reception to the album was mixed. The album's second single, "Most Girls", peaked at No. 4 on the Billboard Hot 100 and became her first chart-topping single in Australia. "You Make Me Sick" was released as the final single and reached No. 33 on the Hot 100.

Pink won the trophy for Female New Artist of the Year at the 2000 Billboard Music Awards. She was billed as a supporting act on the North American leg of NSYNC's No Strings Attached Tour throughout the summer of 2000. In 2001, Pink, alongside singers Christina Aguilera and Mýa as well as rapper Lil' Kim, performed a cover of "Lady Marmalade" for the soundtrack of the film Moulin Rouge!. In the US it became the most successful airplay-only single in history, as well as Pink's first No. 1 single. The success of the single was helped by its music video, which was popular on music channels and won the MTV Video Music Award for Video of the Year. The song won Pink's first Grammy Award for Best Pop Collaboration with Vocals.

Tired of being marketed as another cookie cutter pop act, as well as eager both to be seen as a more serious songwriter and musician and to perform the type of music she wanted to, Pink took her sound in a new direction and sought more artistic and creative control during the recording of her second album, Missundaztood. She recruited Linda Perry, former singer of 4 Non Blondes (one of Pink's favorite groups in her teenage years). Pink moved into Perry's Los Angeles home where the pair spent several months writing songs for the album. Perry co-wrote and co-produced the album with Dallas Austin and Scott Storch, and according to VH1's Driven program, Antonio "LA" Reid of LaFace Records was not initially content with the new music Pink was making. The album, named Missundaztood because of Pink's belief that people had a wrong image of her, was released in November 2001.

"Get the Party Started" was released as the lead single and peaked at No. 4 on the Billboard Hot 100. It also became a worldwide hit, reaching No. 1 in Australia, Ireland, New Zealand, Romania, and Spain, as well as spending four weeks at the top of the European Hot 100 Singles chart. At the 2002 MTV Video Music Awards, its music video won in the categories of Best Female Video and Best Dance Video. The album's other singles—"Don't Let Me Get Me", "Just Like a Pill", and "Family Portrait"—were also radio and chart successes, with "Just Like a Pill" becoming Pink's second No. 1 hit in the United Kingdom. Missundaztood remains Pink's best-selling record with more than 13 million copies sold worldwide. According to the International Federation of the Phonographic Industry (IFPI), Missundaztood was the eighth best-selling album of 2002 globally. Pink won a World Music Award for Best Selling American Pop/Rock Female Artist. She was also nominated for Best Pop Vocal Album and Best Female Pop Vocal Performance at the 45th Grammy Awards. Faith Hill's 2002 album, Cry, features a song co-written by Pink and Perry ("If You're Gonna Fly Away"). In 2002, Pink headlined a tour of America, Europe, and Australia named the Party Tour, as well as becoming a supporting act for Lenny Kravitz's American tour. Pink was named the Top Female Billboard 200 Artist of 2002.

=== 2003–2007: Try This and I'm Not Dead ===
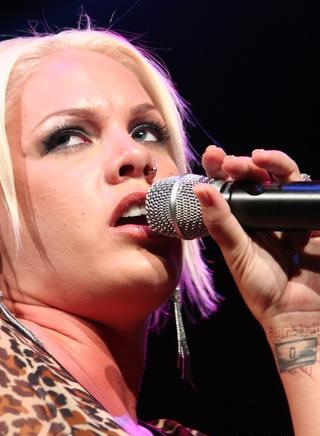
Pink performing in 2006

In mid-2003, Pink contributed the song "Feel Good Time" to the soundtrack of the film Charlie's Angels: Full Throttle, in which she had a cameo appearance as a motocross race ramp owner/promoter. Featuring electronic music artist William Orbit, it became Pink's first single to miss the Top 40 on Billboard's Hot 100 chart, although it was a hit in Europe and in Australia. It was later included on non-US editions of Pink's third album, Try This, which was released on November 11, 2003. Eight of the 13 tracks were co-written with Tim Armstrong of the band Rancid. Linda Perry was featured on the album as a writer and musician. Despite the album reaching the Top 10 on album charts in the US, in Canada, in the UK, and in Australia, sales were considerably lower than those of Missundaztood. However, it did go platinum in the US. The singles "Trouble" and "God Is a DJ" did not reach the US top 40 but did reach the top ten in other countries, and "Last to Know" was released as a single outside North America. "Trouble" earned Pink the Grammy award in Best Female Rock Vocal Performance category at the 46th Annual Grammy Awards, and "Feel Good Time" was nominated for Best Pop Collaboration with Vocals. She toured extensively on the Try This Tour through Europe and Australia, where the album was better received.

During the same period, Pink co-wrote the song "Take a Picture" with Damon Elliott which was released on Mýa's album Moodring. In 2005, Pink collaborated with Lisa Marie Presley on the track "Shine", released on Presley's second album Now What. Pink took a break to write the songs for her fourth album, I'm Not Dead, which she said she titled as such because "It's about being alive and feisty and not sitting down and shutting up even though people would like you to." Pink worked with producers Max Martin, Billy Mann, Christopher Rojas, Butch Walker, Lukasz Gottwald, and Josh Abraham on the album. The album's release through LaFace Records in April 2006 was a substantial success throughout the world, particularly in Australia. The album reached the Top 10 in the US, the Top 5 in the UK, No. 1 in Germany, and was No. 1 in Australia for two non-consecutive weeks.

The album's lead single, "Stupid Girls", was Pink's biggest US hit since 2002 and earned her a Grammy Award nomination for Best Female Pop Vocal Performance. Its music video, in which she parodies celebrities such as Lindsay Lohan, Jessica Simpson, Mary-Kate Olsen, and Paris Hilton, won the MTV Video Music Award for Best Pop Video. Subsequent singles "Who Knew" and "U + Ur Hand" were substantial hits in Australia and Europe, and they later became Top 10 singles in the US. in 2007. The non-US singles were "Nobody Knows", a minor hit in the UK, Australia and Germany; "Dear Mr. President", an open letter to the US President George W. Bush that featured the Indigo Girls and became a No. 1 hit in Belgium as well as a Top 5 hit in Germany, Australia, and other countries; "Leave Me Alone (I'm Lonely)", a UK Top 40 and Australian Top 5 entry; and "'Cuz I Can". The album has sold more than 1.3 million copies in the US, as well as over 700,000 copies in Australia. The album proved very popular in Australia, with six Top 5 singles and a record-breaking 62 weeks in the Top 10; so far the album has gone 10 times platinum.

In support of the album, Pink embarked on the world I'm Not Dead Tour, for which ticket sales in Australia were particularly high; she sold approximately 307,000 tickets in Australia, giving her the record for the biggest concert attendance for an arena tour by a female artist. One of the London shows on the tour was taped and released as a DVD, Pink: Live from Wembley Arena, where she sang Linda Perry's "Whats Up?". In 2006, Pink was chosen to sing the theme song for NBC Sunday Night Football, "Waiting All Day for Sunday Night", which is a take on "I Hate Myself for Loving You" by Joan Jett. She contributed a cover of Rufus's "Tell Me Something Good" to the soundtrack of the film Happy Feet, and lent her name to PlayStation to promote the PSP, a special Pink edition of which was released.

Pink collaborated with several other artists in 2006 and 2007 when she opened for Justin Timberlake on the American leg of his FutureSex/LoveShow Tour. She sang on the Indigo Girls album Despite Our Differences. She was featured on India.Arie's song "I Am Not My Hair" from the Lifetime Television film Why I Wore Lipstick to My Mastectomy. She wrote a song, "I Will", for Natalia's third album, Everything and More. "Outside of You", another song she co-wrote, was recorded by dance-pop singer Hilary Duff and released on her 2007 album Dignity. Pink recorded a song with Annie Lennox and twenty-two other female acts for Lennox's fourth solo studio album, Songs of Mass Destruction; titled "Sing"; it was written as an anthem for HIV/AIDS, according to Lennox's website. In December 2007, a special edition Pink Box, which comprises her second to fourth albums and the DVD Live in Europe, was released in Australia. It reached the Top 20 on the albums chart and was certified Gold, selling more than 35,000 units.

=== 2008–2011: Funhouse and Greatest Hits... So Far!!! ===
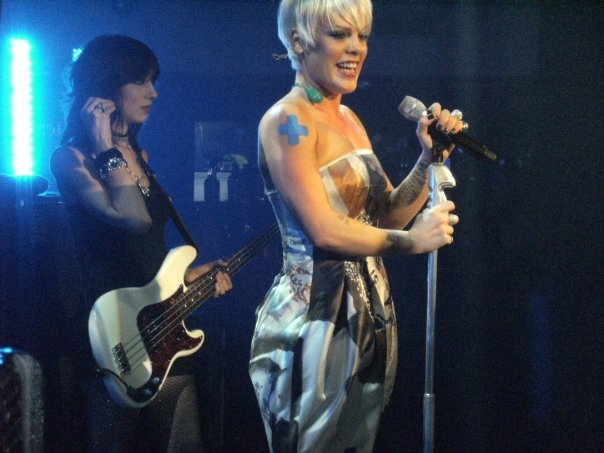
Pink at a London performance to promote the Funhouse album, November 2008

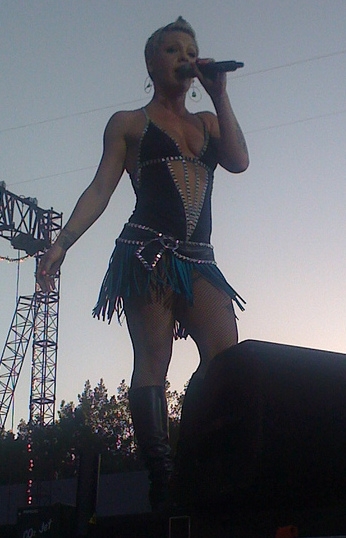
Pink performing at Main Square Festival in 2010

On August 7, 2008, Pink's single "So What" was leaked online, and radio stations across Australia were quick to give it massive airplay. Less than six hours after the leak, "So What" was voted No. 1 on Nova 100 Melbourne and shot to No. 1 on the Today Network's national radio Hot30 Countdown. On August 22, Pink announced a new track, titled "Crystal Ball". On September 18, 2008, "So What" became her second number-one hit on the Billboard Hot 100. Pink was the guest of honor at the 2008 ARIA Music Awards, which were held in Sydney, Australia, in October 2008. There she sang "So What". On November 3, 2008, Funhouse debuted at No. 1 on the ARIA charts. In Australia it sold over 86,000 units in its first week, and was eventually certified eleven times platinum.

On November 23, 2008, Pink performed "Sober", the second single from Funhouse, at the American Music Awards. The third single was "Please Don't Leave Me", with a video directed by Dave Meyers. In Australia, "Bad Influence" was released as the album's fourth single as a promotional single for her Funhouse Tour, and "Funhouse" was later released as the fifth single. However, "Bad Influence" was not released as a single in Europe until March 2010, which was after "Funhouse" had been released. In May 2009, Pink released a four-CD box set of her first four albums; this set peaked at No. 7 in the UK Album Chart. In 2009, Pink performed in The People Speak, a documentary feature film that uses dramatic and musical performances of the letters, diaries, and speeches of everyday Americans, based on historian Howard Zinn's A People's History of the United States.

Pink's Funhouse Tour started in France on February 24, 2009, and continued through Europe until mid-May, with supporting act Raygun. Pink then performed a series of shows in Australia, all of which sold out. Between May and August 2009, she performed for a total of more than 600,000 Australian fans at 58 shows around the country.

On September 13, 2009, Pink performed "Sober" while doing a trapeze act at the 2009 MTV Video Music Awards, where she was nominated for Best Female Video for "So What". On January 31, 2010, Pink did another circus act in the form of aerial silks at the 2010 Grammy Awards, this time performing the song "Glitter in the Air". She received a standing ovation. In 2013, Billboard ranked the performance as the best between 2000 and 2012. Billboard recognized Pink as the Pop Songs Artist of the Decade. According to the BBC countdown compiled by PPL, Pink was the second most-played female solo artist in the United Kingdom during the 2000s decade, behind Madonna.

Pink was a soloist in the remake of the 1985 charity single, "We Are the World". She collaborated on the 2010 Herbie Hancock album, The Imagine Project, in which she sang Peter Gabriel's "Don't Give Up" with John Legend and contributed vocals to John Lennon's "Imagine" with Seal, India.Arie, Jeff Beck, Konono Nº1, Oumou Sangaré, and others. The last collaboration earned Pink a Grammy Award for Best Pop Collaboration with Vocals. She was featured on a track titled "Won't Back Down" for Eminem's 2010 album Recovery; Eminem explained that he included Pink because he "felt like she would smash this record."

On July 15, 2010, during a concert in Nuremberg, Germany, Pink was preparing to end her concert with an aerial acrobatic routine when she was pulled offstage and onto a barricade below. Her left-side flywire had been activated before the right-side one had been properly attached to her harness. She was taken to a local hospital where it was determined that she had not been seriously injured. Pink sold a total of 3,000,000 concert tickets on her 2009–10 worldwide tour, according to a statement on behalf of UK tour promoter Marshall Arts.

In the first week of October 2010, Pink released "Raise Your Glass", the first single from her first compilation album, Greatest Hits... So Far!!!. The song celebrates a decade of solo work, and is dedicated to her fans who have been supporting her over the years. The song reached the top of the Billboard Hot 100, becoming Pink's tenth Top 10 hit, and her third number-one on the chart. She released the compilation album on November 12, 2010, and almost a month later she released the album's second single, named "Fuckin' Perfect". The song reached number two on the Billboard Hot 100, and peaked at number one on the airplay charts in Germany. On the German singles chart, the song entered at number seven in March 2011.

Pink voiced the character of Gloria in Happy Feet Two, which premiered on November 18, 2011, in the United States. She also sings the movie's theme song, "Bridge of Light".

On October 7, 2011, RCA Music Group announced that it would be disbanding Jive Records, along with Arista Records and J Records. With the shutdown, Pink and all other artists previously signed to the labels would release any future material through RCA Records.

=== 2012–2015: The Truth About Love and You+Me ===
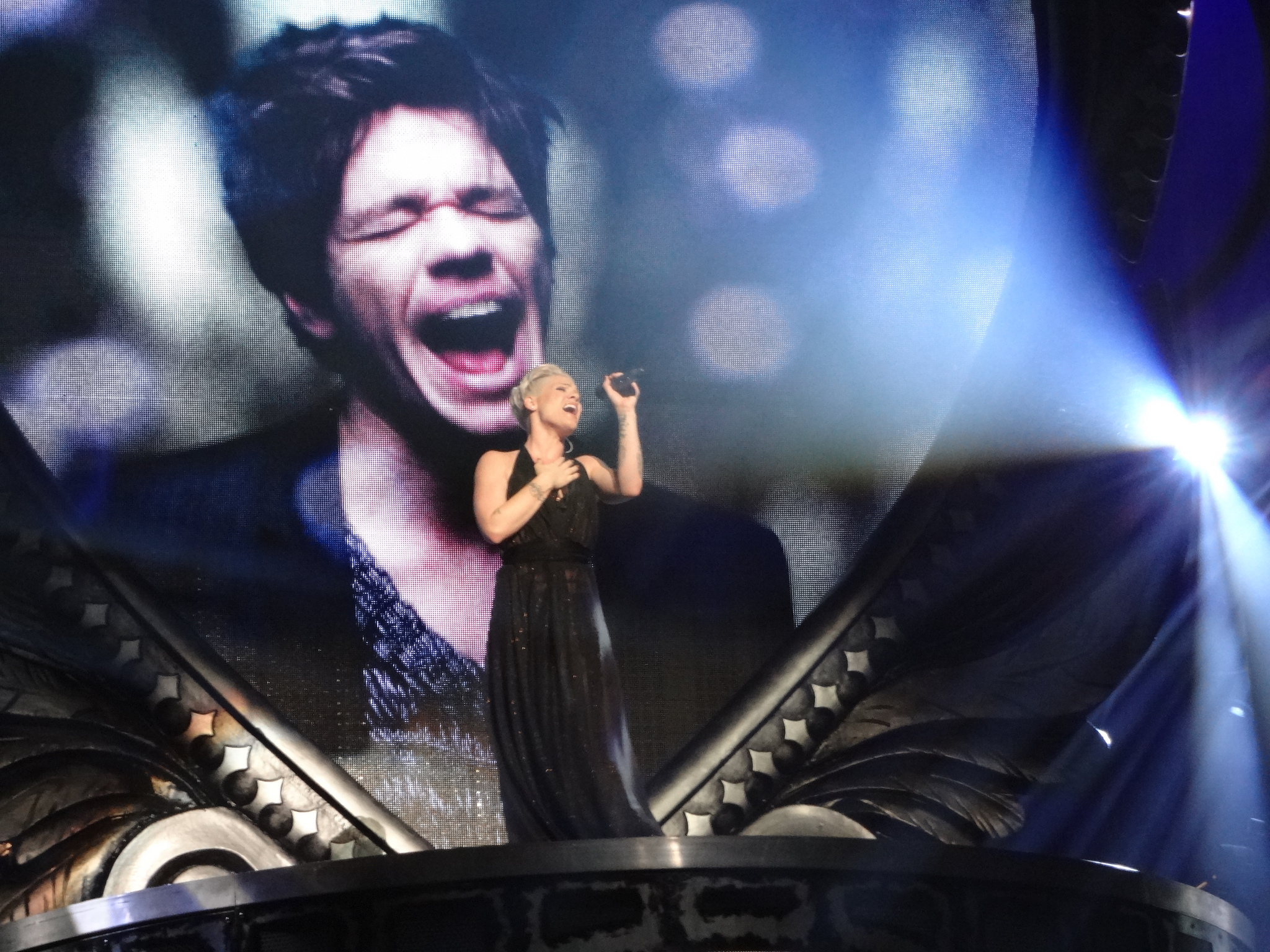
Pink performing "Just Give Me a Reason" with Nate Ruess in 2013

In February 2012, Pink confirmed that she was in the writing process for her next studio album, The Truth About Love. She was scheduled to perform at a fundraiser for the presidential campaign of Barack Obama that June, but had to cancel her performance after she was hospitalized and underwent the removal of her gallbladder. The Truth About Love was preceded with the release of its lead single, "Blow Me (One Last Kiss)", in July. The single peaked at number five on the Billboard Hot 100, while reaching number one in Australia and Hungary, and the top five in Canada, Japan, and the United Kingdom. Released in September, The Truth About Love made its debut atop the Billboard 200 with first-week sales of 281,000, making it her first number-one album in the United States. It also topped the charts in Australia, Austria, Canada, Germany, New Zealand, Sweden, and Switzerland, and became the world's sixth best-selling album of 2012 according to the IFPI. The album was certified double platinum by the RIAA for two million copies shipped and has sold over seven million copies worldwide. The Truth About Love received positive response from music critics and was nominated for Best Pop Vocal Album at the 55th Annual Grammy Awards.

"Try" was released as the second single from The Truth About Love in October 2012 and became a worldwide top-ten hit, peaking at number nine on the Billboard Hot 100. In February 2013, Pink released the fourth single, "Just Give Me a Reason", featuring guest vocals by Nate Ruess of Fun. It became the most successful single from The Truth About Love, topping the record charts in more than 20 countries worldwide and becoming Pink's fourth number-one hit on the Billboard Hot 100. According to the IFPI, the song was the fourth best-selling digital single of 2013 with 9.9 million copies sold worldwide. The song won the Billboard Mid-Year Award for Favorite Hot 100 No. 1 Song, and garnered two nominations for Best Pop Duo/Group Performance and Song of the Year at the 56th Annual Grammy Awards. Three further singles, "True Love", "Walk of Shame", and "Are We All We Are", was released throughout 2013 to less commercial success. On February 13, 2013, Pink kicked off her sixth tour, known as The Truth About Love Tour, in Phoenix, Arizona. Billboard released a statement on June 14, announcing that Pink held the No. 1 spot on their Hot Tours chart, as the American leg of her Truth About Love Tour grossed over $23.6 million. She still held the title a week later, as the European leg grossed $30.7 million.

In addition to her work for The Truth About Love, Pink appeared on the track "Guns and Roses" on T.I.'s album Trouble Man: Heavy Is the Head. The song has been certified Gold by the ARIA for sales of 35,000 digital downloads shipped in Australia. She also wrote two songs, "I Walk Alone" and "Lie to Me", for Cher's new album, Closer to the Truth. Pink starred as a sex addict alongside Gwyneth Paltrow and Mark Ruffalo in the 2012 movie Thanks for Sharing. The official trailer was released on June 27 and the movie premiered in the United States until September 20, 2013. Her legal name, Alecia Moore, is used for the movie credits. Her role as Dede was heavily praised by critics. rogerebert.com commented on her performance saying "Of all the cast here, the least experienced is the pop singer Pink, yet she does the best acting in the film: natural, a little harsh, a little unstable. Pink, like Macy Gray in her Lee Daniels movie roles, knows instinctively how to behave on camera by just pretending that the camera isn't there."

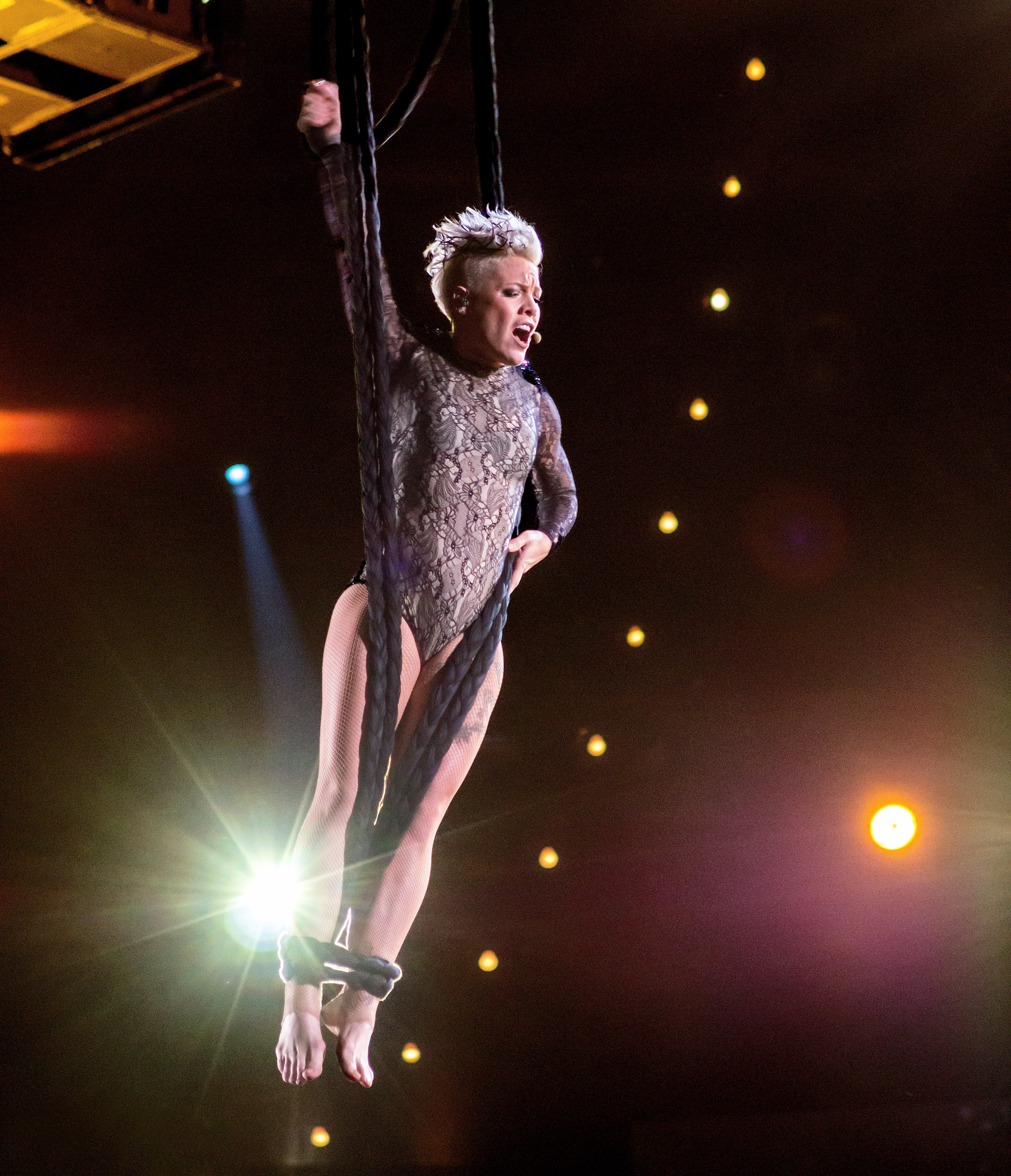
Pink performing at the Grammy Awards in 2014

Billboard named Pink Woman of the Year 2013. In December, the magazine also named The Truth About Love Tour the third best selling tour of 2013 with $147.9 million in ticket sales; falling only behind Bon Jovi and Michael Jackson: The Immortal World Tour. Also in Billboard's end of year charts, Pink was ranked the sixth top artist of 2013 and she scored her highest charting end-of-year song and album; with Just Give Me a Reason sitting at number 7 on the Billboard Hot 100 and The Truth About Love placing at number 8 on the Billboard 200. In Australia, Pink has had an album placed at number one or two in the ARIA End of Year Albums Chart for six out of the past seven years as The Truth About Love topped the chart for two years in a row, making it the first album in Australian chart history to do so. She was the ninth top grossing music artist of 2013, with $20,072,072.32 earned. RCA Records later announced that they have signed Pink for a multi-album deal that will last for years to come. The singer was quoted about the deal saying "I am super-duper excited to continue onwards and upwards with RCA and my team there".

It was announced in September 2014, that Pink and Dallas Green, lead singer of City and Colour, worked together on a collaborative album, under the band name You+Me. The album, titled Rose Ave., was released on October 14, 2014. The album debuted at number four on the Billboard 200 and at number one on the US Folk Albums chart.

In August 2015, Pink recorded the theme song for the 13th season of The Ellen DeGeneres Show. The song, "Today's the Day", was performed during the show's premiere week in New York City on September 10, 2015.

=== 2016–2020: Beautiful Trauma, Hurts 2B Human and hiatus ===
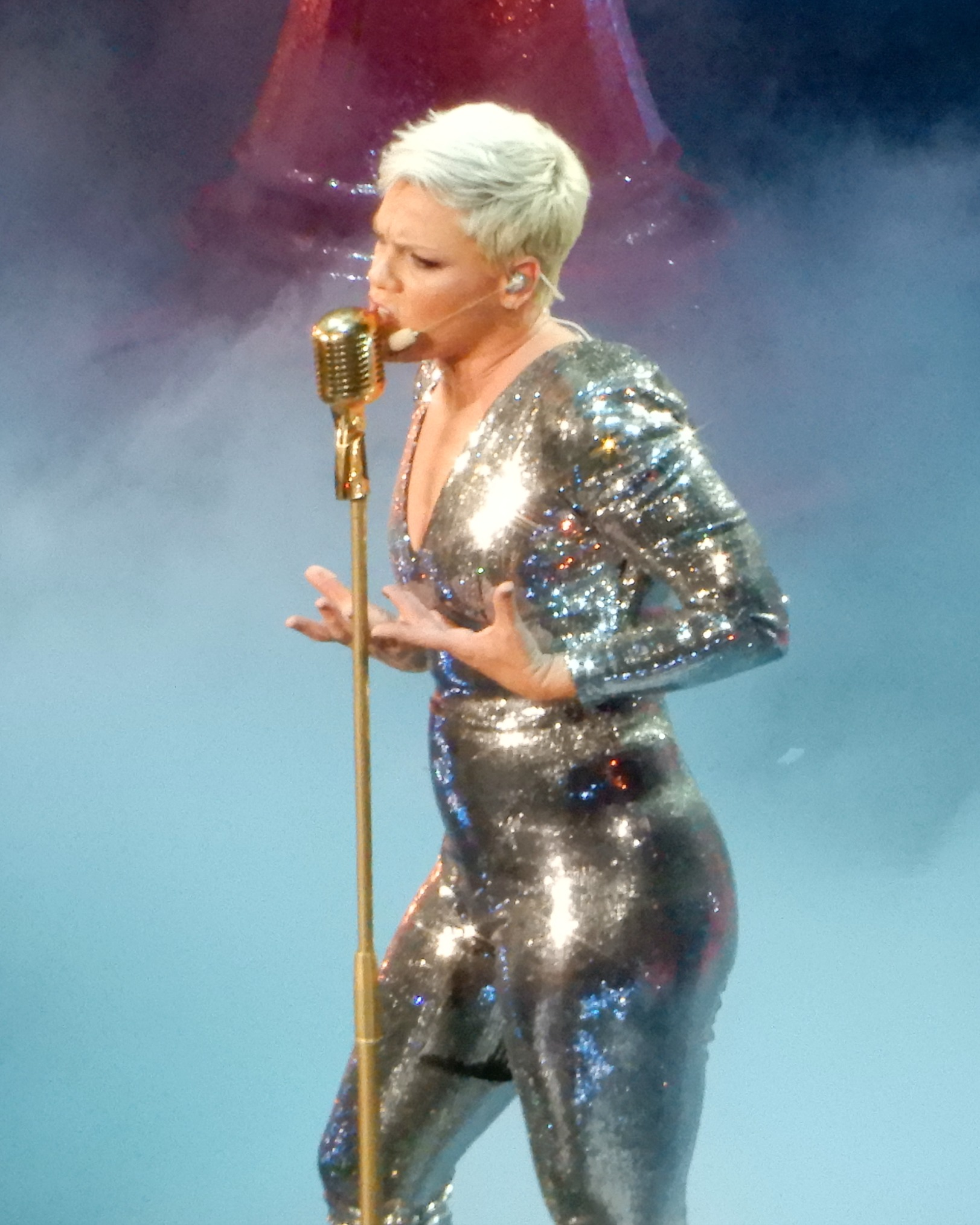
Pink performing at Madison Square Garden in 2018

It was announced in February 2016 that Pink would cover the Beatles' song "Lucy in the Sky with Diamonds" for the upcoming Netflix original series Beat Bugs. In the same month, it was announced that she had recorded a cover of "White Rabbit" for the movie Alice Through the Looking Glass, while in April it was revealed that she contributed the song "Just like Fire" to the soundtrack of the movie. In Australia, it topped the ARIA Charts. The following July, it was announced that Pink had written a song for French-Canadian singer Celine Dion called "Recovering" for inclusion on her upcoming English-language album. Pink provided guest vocals on country singer Kenny Chesney's single "Setting the World on Fire" which was released on August 1, 2016. The single topped on the Billboard Hot Country Songs and went platinum in the United States and Canada. On March 10, 2017, Pink teamed up with Stargate and Australian star Sia on the former's debut single, "Waterfall".

Pink took a break to write songs for her upcoming seventh album. In June 2017, she confirmed her next studio album was in the works. "What About Us", the lead single from Pink's seventh studio album, Beautiful Trauma, was released on August 10, 2017 and reached number one in Australia. The album was released on October 13, 2017, and became the third best-selling album of the year worldwide. Pink received the Michael Jackson Video Vanguard Award at the 2017 MTV Video Music Awards. She also performed a medley of some of her songs, including her new single, "What About Us", before accepting the award, which was presented to her by Ellen DeGeneres. "What About Us" reached number one on the Adult Pop Songs chart, earning Pink her ninth leader on the chart, breaking her out of a tie with Katy Perry for the solo female artist with the most number-ones in the chart's history and placing her in second place among all acts. The song received one nomination at the 60th Annual Grammy Awards for Best Pop Solo Performance. "Beautiful Trauma" was released on November 21, 2017, as the second single from Beautiful Trauma to less commercial success, reaching top thirty in Australia, the United Kingdom, and France. While it only managed to peak at number seventy-eight on the Billboard Hot 100, it topped on the Billboard Dance Club Songs chart. On December 5, 2017, rapper Eminem revealed that Pink would be collaborating on the song "Need Me" for his ninth studio album Revival. The album received the nomination for Best Pop Vocal Album earned Pink's 20th nomination at the Annual Grammy Awards.

Although sick with influenza, Pink sang the US national anthem ahead of Super Bowl LII, a dream she had since, as a child, seeing Whitney Houston sing at Super Bowl XXV in 1991. On March 1, 2018, Pink started her seventh concert tour, the Beautiful Trauma World Tour, which was scheduled to visit North America and Oceania until September 8, 2018. She later decided to extend the tour until May 2019 including Europe. On April 6, 2018, she was featured on Elton John's Revamp & Restoration, singing the song "Bennie and the Jets", with Elton John himself and Logic.

On April 17, 2018, People teased its 2018 "Most Beautiful" cover star by calling her "a performer, mother and role model whose honesty, humour, confidence and sheer star power make her one of the most beloved and fascinating entertainers on the planet." The next day the magazine revealed the cover, which features Pink with her two kids Willow and Jameson. The magazine issue was named the "beautiful issue". Similar covers had featured Julia Roberts and Jennifer Aniston. On October 23, 2018, Pink released her version of the song "A Million Dreams" from the upcoming "The Greatest Showman – Reimagined" album, a reworking of the soundtrack with contributions from various artists including Kelly Clarkson, Kesha, Jess Glynne and Missy Elliott. Pink's daughter, Willow Sage Hart is also featured on the album performing the song's reprise.

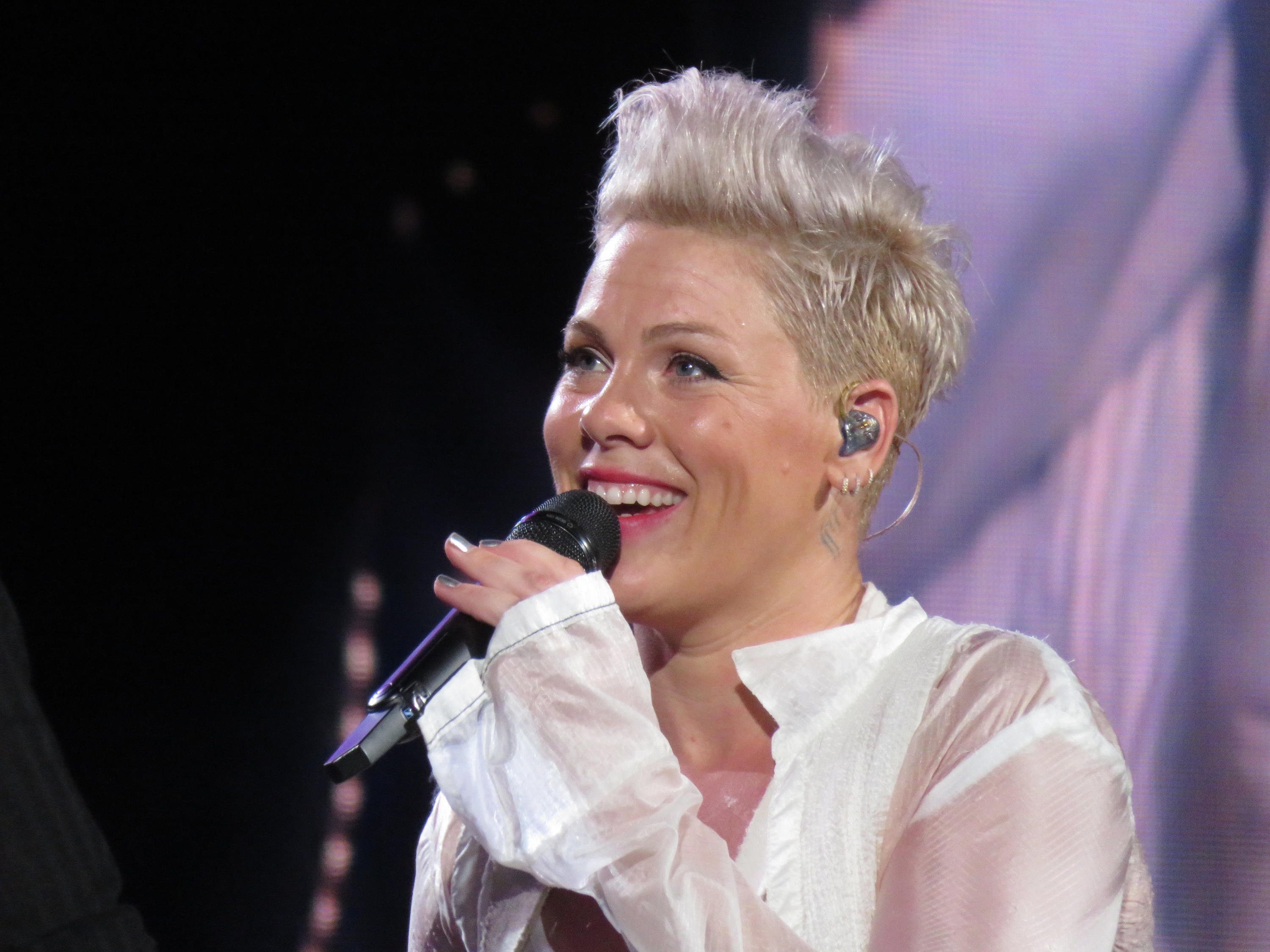
Pink at Olympiastadion, Munich, in 2019

On February 5, 2019, Pink received a star on the Hollywood Walk of Fame; she further announced the release of her eighth album, Hurts 2B Human, which was released on April 26, 2019. The album's lead single, "Walk Me Home" was released on February 20, 2019. On the release date, Pink performed the song alongside a medley of her biggest hits at the BRIT Awards, including "Try", "Just Give Me a Reason", with Fun lead singer Nate Ruess, and "What About Us". She was also awarded with the Outstanding Contribution to Music Award at the 2019 Brit Awards. In December 2019, Pollstar named her Artist of the Year. Pink confirmed that in 2020 she will take a break from music to focus on her family. On September 16, 2020, she released "One Too Many", a collaboration with Keith Urban for his album "The Speed of Now Part 1".

=== 2021–present: All I Know So Far and Trustfall ===
On February 12, 2021, Pink released the song "Cover Me in Sunshine", a duet with her daughter Willow Sage Hart. On April 9, 2021, she released the song "Anywhere Away from Here", a duet with Rag'n'Bone Man. On April 29, she announced a live album, All I Know So Far: Setlist, which was released on May 21. The album contains the live versions of previous Pink songs, live covers and "Cover Me in Sunshine". It also includes the title track, released as a single on May 7. All I Know So Far: Setlist serves as the companion album to the documentary film covering Pink's life of the same name, which was released simultaneously with the album through Amazon's Prime Video platform. In April 2021, Pink confirmed to Entertainment Tonight Canada that a ninth studio album was in the "very early days, but I will tell you, it will be very honest".

In February 2022, Pink partnered with Calm and narrated three bedtime stories. She released a protest song "Irrelevant" on July 14, 2022. Later that year, she attended the Taylor Hawkins Tribute Concert in Los Angeles, performing "Barracuda" by Heart, "Somebody To Love" by Queen and "The Pretender" by Foo Fighters.

On November 4, 2022, Pink released the single "Never Gonna Not Dance Again", which served as the lead single from her album Trustfall. A day later, she inducted Dolly Parton into the Rock and Roll Hall of Fame. Pink performed "Never Gonna Not Dance Again" at the American Music Awards on November 20 while on roller skates. On the same night, she paid tribute to Olivia Newton-John with a performance of "Hopelessly Devoted to You". Pink released her ninth studio album Trustfall on February 17, 2023. It debuted at number one in the United Kingdom and Australia while debuting at number two in the United States. On June 7, 2023, Pink started her eighth concert tour Summer Carnival in Bolton.

On August 23, 2024, Pink performed "What About Us" along with her daughter at the 2024 Democratic National Convention in Chicago, Illinois. That October, Pink announced that the next four shows would be postponed "[d]ue to reasons beyond my control". The affected shows were planned for October 20–24 in Lincoln, Sioux Falls, Milwaukee, and Des Moines.

In March 2026, Pink guest-hosted The Kelly Clarkson Show for a week. On April 9, 2026, it was announced that Pink would be hosting the 79th Tony Awards. On June 2, 2026, it was announced that Pink would be executive producing the "Sara Bareilles: Good Grief" documentary.

==== Upcoming projects ====
Pink will headline a concert residency at Sphere in Las Vegas, scheduled to take place from September to October 2027. She will be the first female to headline at the venue.

== Artistry ==
=== Influences ===
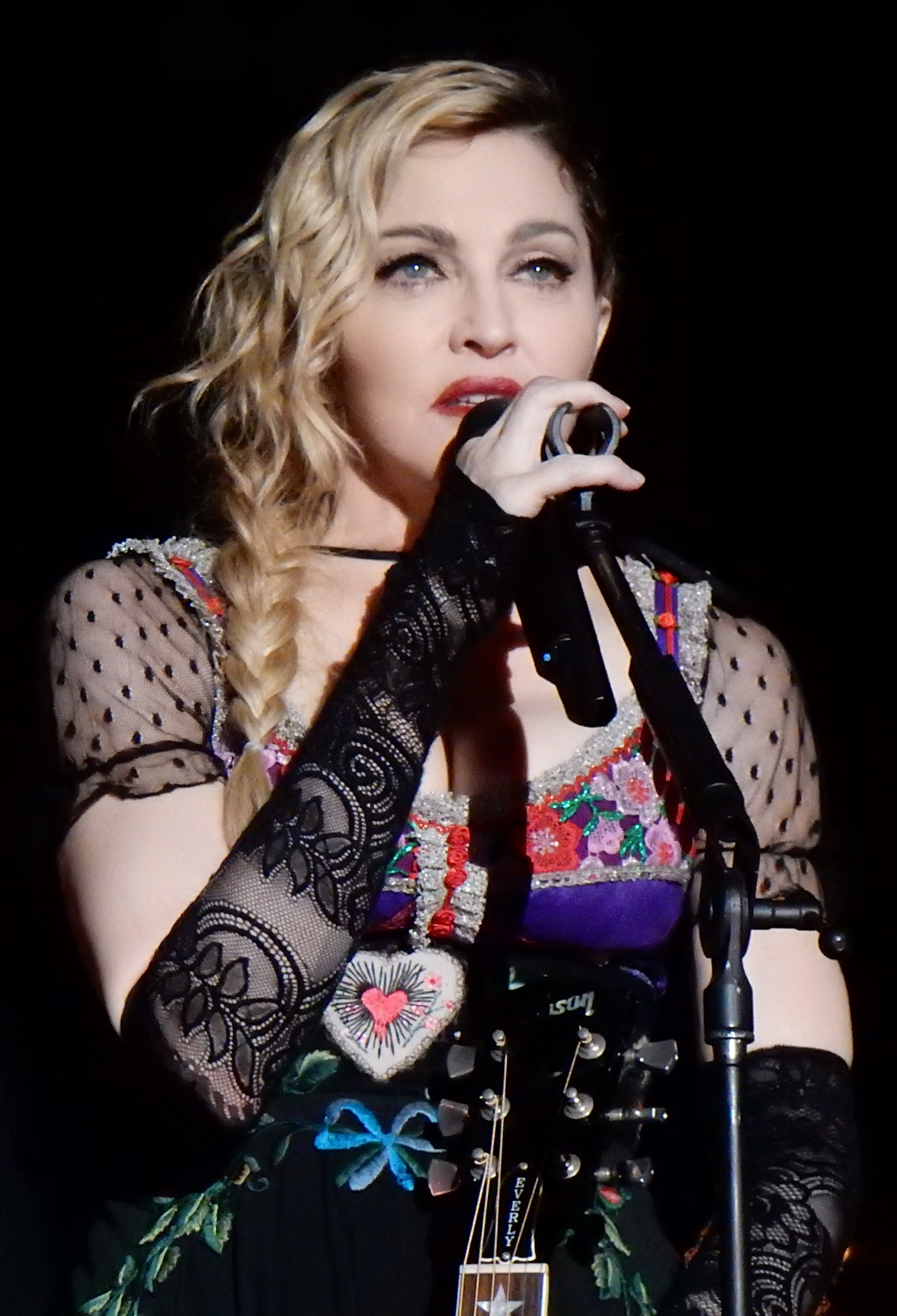
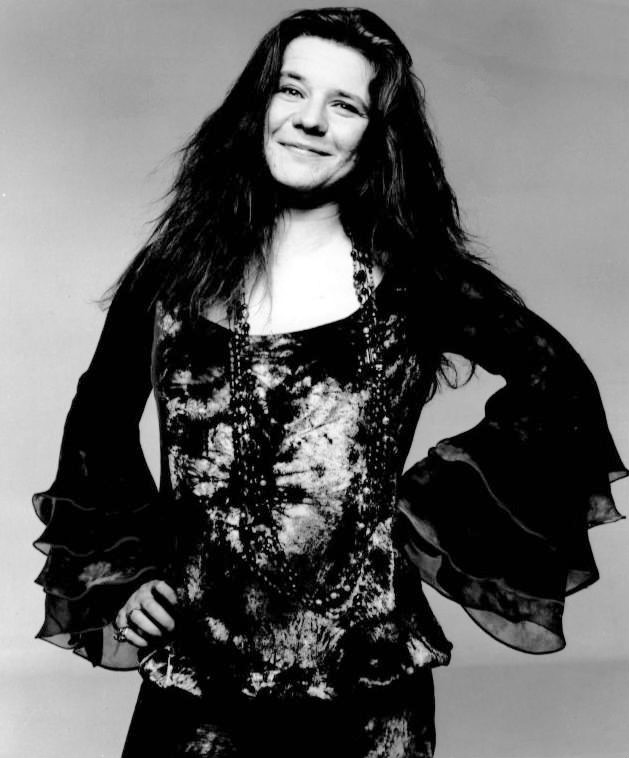
Madonna (left) and Janis Joplin (right) are some of Pink's musical influences.

Recognized for her acrobatic stage presence, Pink started studying Aerial silks after watching a Cher concert from her Living Proof: The Farewell Tour in 2004; Cher would later guest-star as God in Pink's music video for "All I Know So Far". Pink has also identified Madonna and Janis Joplin as some of her musical influences. In a 2000 interview with MTV, she said that during her childhood she used to think that she was Madonna's daughter, saying: "I've always been the type of person that followed Madonna like a lost puppy. I didn't speak to my mother for a year, because I was sure she adopted me." She added, "Madonna has always been an inspiration for me... I was a fan right from the first time I heard 'Holiday'." Pink also won her first talent show singing Madonna's "Oh Father". Of Joplin, Pink said, "She was so inspiring by singing blues music when it wasn't culturally acceptable for white women, and she wore her heart on her sleeve. She was so witty and charming and intelligent, but she also battled an ugly-duckling syndrome. I would love to play her in a movie." In a tribute performance on her Try This Tour, Pink called Joplin "a woman who inspired me when everyone else ... didn't!" Other artists who have inspired her include Whitney Houston, Mary J. Blige, Billy Joel, Donny Hathaway, and PJ Harvey.

As a child, Pink admired the lead singer of 4 Non Blondes, Linda Perry, whom she tracked down and formed a close relationship with on her second album. She said:

Literally this woman spoke to me. Being in pain and being on drugs and being misunderstood and, yeah she spoke my language. Without having to say anything, she could sing a note and it was what I was feeling. I used to sit at three or four o' clock in the morning, tripping on whatever, screaming 4 Non Blondes out the window until the cops were called.

=== Voice and timbre ===
Throughout her career, Pink has received acclaim from critics for her powerful singing abilities. Pink is a contralto, whose voice has been described as "raspy", "husky", and "distinctive". NBC News music critic Maura Johnston said that, at times, "the sheer power of her alto" has been overshadowed by her skills as an aerialist. James Montgomery of MTV calls her "a deceptively good singer ... who can out-sing almost anyone". The Guardian called her voice "prodigious". Ann Powers of the Los Angeles Times labeled her "a powerhouse vocalist". Pink has also been noted for her "raw", "soulful" voice and her ability to emote. The Inquirer called her voice "husky" and "gutsy", and wrote that she had developed into a "powerfully emotive vocalist", comparing her to Janis Joplin. The Star Tribune wrote, "Her slightly raspy, slightly soulful voice made you feel the dysfunction in 'Family Portrait', the longing of 'Who Knew' and the empowerment in 'Perfect'." CNN has said that Pink is known for singing "with the right level of emotion". Kelly Clarkson has called Pink's voice "the best of our generation". Troy L. Smith, writing for Cleveland.com, called Pink one of her generation's most underrated vocalists, writing that she is capable of "sing[ing] anything, from rock and pop to folk and R&B." Smith named her 2006's second best vocalist, runner-up to Carrie Underwood.

=== Musical style ===
Pink stated she "doesn't want to be stuck in a box" and wants to "be bold and go all out". Although Pink's music is primarily rooted in pop, she often incorporates elements of rock, and her early work has been categorized as R&B. Her sound has been described as pop rock, pop-punk, and power pop. She also delved into punk rock, dance-rock, electronic rock, funk rock, soft rock, country pop, folk, dance-pop, synth-pop and EDM.

Variety described her as "pop's bionic woman", "gymnast-therapist" and "music's most radio-friendly rebel".

== Philanthropy and activism ==
Pink is involved with several charities and campaigns, including Human Rights Campaign, ONE Campaign, The Prince's Trust, New York Restoration Project, Run for the Cure Foundation, Save the Children, Take Back the Night, UNICEF, World Animal Protection, One Billion Rising, Youth Off The Streets, Black Lives Matter, Good Ride, Girls Just Want to Have Fundamental Rights Fund, Jeans For Refugees and Family Equality. She also donated money to NAACP and Autism Speaks. Pink was awarded the "People's Champion Award" at the 2019 People's Choice Awards for her work with a number of organizations.

=== Feminism and LGBTQ rights ===
Pink identifies as a feminist and pro-choice. Pink attended the 2017 Women's March, a widely attended protest in favor of women's rights and equality alongside her family. In 2018, she released "Wild Hearts Can't Be Broken" in support of the Suffragette movement. On Women's Equality Day in 2019, Gillie and Marc Art unveiled a bronze sculpture of Pink as a part of Statues for Equality mission. In July 2021, she offered to pay the fines handed out to the Norwegian women's beach handball team after they wore shorts like their male counterparts instead of bikini bottoms. In 2023 and 2025, Pink hosted the Desert Smash Celebrity Charity Tennis Event benefitting the WTA Foundation Global Women's Health Fund, that supports access to "life-saving women's health and nutrition products and services. In April 2026, Pink received the "Champion of Change Award" from Planned Parenthood for "her outspoken support of reproductive rights for all".

Pink is also outspoken about LGBTQ rights and supports same-sex marriage. In her 2006 song "Dear Mr. President", she criticized then-President George W. Bush's opposition to gay marriage, singing: "What kind of father would hate his own daughter if she were gay?". In November 2008, Pink marched against Proposition 8, a proposition to ban gay marriage, at a rally in downtown Los Angeles. The singer was awarded with the "Ally for Equality Award" at the Human Rights Campaign Dinner in 2010. In an interview with Gaydar Radio from 2012, the singer stated: "I think that the best day will be when we no longer talk about being gay or straight – it's not a 'gay wedding', it's just a 'wedding'; it's not a 'gay marriage', it's just 'a marriage.'" In 2012, she told The Advocate that she had girlfriends in her twenties but does not define her sexual orientation, saying, "I never felt the need to." During the same interview, the singer mentioned her appreciation for her lesbian and bisexual female fans. In 2023, Billboard named her song "Raise Your Glass" as one of the top LGBT Anthems of All Time at number 31. In an interview with Gay Times, Pink stated that the LGBTQ community means "everything to her". She added: "I think [my LGBTQ+ following] just speaks to who I am and what I believe in, and what I've always been. I am definitely an ally and to be understood for that is a wonderful feeling. For any of us to be understood, that's what we want in life, right? We want to love, be loved and be seen."

=== Animal rights ===
Pink is an animal rights activist. In 2003, she declined an invitation to perform at Prince William's 21st birthday bash on account of the Royal Family's controversial stance on animal hunting. Pink is a prominent campaigner for People for the Ethical Treatment of Animals (PETA), contributing her voice to causes such as protest against KFC. In conjunction with PETA, she criticized the Australian wool industry for its use of mulesing. In 2007, she said PETA had misled her about mulesing and that she had not done enough research before lending her name to the campaign. Her campaigning led to a headlining concert called PAW (Party for Animals Worldwide) in Cardiff, Wales, on August 21, 2007. As of May 2008, she has been officially recognized as an advocate for RSPCA Australia. The singer joined Ricky Gervais for PETA's "Stolen for Fashion" advertisement, which opposes wearing fur and animal skin. In 2014, Pink stated she opposes carriage riding in New York City. The singer asked Queen Elizabeth II why the bear fur on the Guards' caps hadn't been replaced with a synthetic, cruelty-free material in 2013. She posed nude in 2015 for PETA's "I'd Rather Go Naked Than Wear Fur" campaign. The singer opposed SeaWorld in 2018 for "locking up" marine animals in sanctuaries where all they are able to do is "swim in endless circles".

=== Childhood hunger activism ===
In December 2015, Pink was appointed as a UNICEF Ambassador and the agency's Kid Power National Spokesperson to help raise awareness about its lifesaving health and nutrition programs around the world. She followed UNICEF to Haiti and witnessed the impact therapeutic food has on malnourished children. In 2023, the singer promoted the charity during the North American leg of the Summer Carnival Tour. QR codes for UNICEF USA were placed at all merchandise stands, which directed fans to purchase basic necessities and school supplies for children in need.

In 2017, Pink and her husband joined a fundraising bike ride that raised $2,000,000 for the Share Our Strength's No Kid Hungry campaign. She partnered with "Save With Stories", a No Kid Hungry collaboration with Save the Children, and read stories on Instagram for children out of school due to the COVID-19 pandemic. In April 2023, Pink received the "National Champion Award" from No Kid Hungry for "her commitment and contributions to help advance No Kid Hungry's national campaign to end childhood hunger in America". Pink and Kelly Clarkson helped raise $60,000 for No Kid Hungry and Sweet Relief Musicians Fund by auctioning off "one-of-a-kind" art pieces depicting their songs in sound waves. Later that year, Pink and her daughter collaborated with Williams Sonoma and designed spatulas for the annual "Tools for Change" fundraising program by No Kid Hungry. In October 2025, Pink received the "Humanitarian Award" from Action Against Hunger for "her extensive advocacy for children and families" and "championing disaster relief and the ongoing fight against hunger".

=== Other causes ===
On February 16, 2009, Pink announced she was donating $250,000 to the Red Cross Bushfire Appeal to aid the victims of the bushfires that swept through the Australian state of Victoria earlier that month. Pink said she wanted to make "a tangible expression of support". Following Australia's bushfires in 2020, Pink donated $500,000 to local fire services. The singer partnered with REVERB on her Beautiful Trauma Tour to reduce its environmental footprint and empower fans to support her work with UNICEF and No Kid Hungry.

On August 21, 2018, Pink stopped her concert in Brisbane for a grieving fan. In 2020, the singer donated $1,000,000 to help fight the pandemic following her recovery from COVID-19. The amount was split between the City of Los Angeles Mayor's Emergency COVID-19 Crisis Fund and the Temple University Hospital Fund in Philadelphia. In 2026, Pink headlined a fundraising Curebound Concert for Cures for cancer research.

In 2022, Pink released a protest song "Irrelevant" and announced all proceeds would be donated to Michelle Obama's nonpartisan voting initiative "When We All Vote". Pink collaborated with PEN America in 2023 to give away 2,000 books at two concerts in Florida in 2023. The titles included Beloved by Toni Morrison, Amanda Gorman's The Hill We Climb, Girls Who Code by Reshma Saujani, Todd Parr's The Family Book, and others from PEN America's Index of Banned Books. In January 2025, Pink performed at the FireAidLA benefit concert to raise money for families affected by wildfires.

=== Political views ===
During the 2008 presidential election, Pink said that Sarah Palin was "terrifying" and criticized her attitudes towards women and animals, and her inexperience on foreign issues. Pink endorsed Hillary Clinton during the 2016 presidential election.

Pink supported Joe Biden during the 2020 presidential election. In June 2020, she mocked Donald Trump over the low attendance of his rally in Tulsa. In July 2024, she attended "White Women: Answer the Call", a Zoom call by gun violence prevention activist Shannon Watts that fundraised on behalf of the Kamala Harris presidential campaign.

==== Israel ====
In October 2023, Pink condemned Hamas and violence at protests related to the Gaza war, while stating that Palestinians deserved a solution that recognized their "aspirations and humanity" and that protecting civilian lives should be paramount. That month, she also denied flying Israeli flags during her concerts, saying the blue-and-white fabric used in the show predated the war and that she did not fly any national flags. Pink has shared social media posts from pro-Israel activist Hen Mazzig.

In September 2026, Pink faced backlash after reposting a statement from pro-Israel advocacy group StopAntisemitism that called for an apology from Macklemore for advocating for Palestinians during his opening act for Ed Sheeran in New Jersey. Following the backlash, Pink said that the post she had shared "said things in words I didn't write, and I wouldn't have chosen all of them... I'm not going to litigate a complex war in an Instagram caption, and I'm not going to recite anybody's slogan to earn back a follower." She said that she supported Palestinian humanity, but that Macklemore's advocacy had "scared [her]". In response to Pink's actions regarding Macklemore's pro-Palestinian stance, a petition calling for her removal as a UNICEF ambassador had amassed more than 162,000 signatures by September 22. The petition's organizers said UNICEF ambassadors should meet the "highest standards of neutrality and compassion" when addressing the impact of conflict on children. Actor Javier Bardem shared multiple posts on Instagram in support of the petition, including posts encouraging his followers to sign a Change.org petition calling for Pink's dismissal as a UNICEF ambassador.

== Other ventures ==
=== Two Wolves Wine ===
In 2013, Pink purchased an 17-acre organic vineyard in Santa Barbara County, which included cabernet sauvignon, grenache, graciano, syrah, petit verdot, grenache blanc, and cabernet franc. In 2015, she added 8 acres and additionally planted sémillon and merlot. Though a high-school dropout, the singer signed up for online Wine and Spirit Educational Trust courses and studied oenology and viticulture at the University of California, Los Angeles and University of California, Davis. The first non-commercial vintage was released in 2014.

In 2018, she officially launched her own brand of wine called "Two Wolves". The winery is being run by five women. All of the wines are single varietals. The wine is also available at select restaurants in California, Illinois, Montana, New York, Oregon, Tennessee, Australia, United Kingdom and Belgium.

=== Endorsements ===
Bally Total Fitness announced an endorsement deal with Pink in 2002, which included a hip-hop aerobics class dubbed "Get Your Body Started". In return, the fitness company served as the sponsor for The Party Tour and hosted several "Pink Parties", where dance competition contestants received Pink-related prizes. The singer also partnered with National Basketball Association (NBA) Entertainment and recorded a musical spot for "Get the Party Started (NBA remix)" which promoted the league. In August 2006, Pink recorded "Waiting All Day for Sunday Night", which served as the opening theme for Sunday Night National Football League (NFL) until 2016. The song is a rework of Joan Jett's "I Hate Myself for Loving You". In 2004, Pink appeared in a Gladiator-themed Pepsi commercial with Britney Spears, Beyoncé and Enrique Iglesias.

Sony Computer Entertainment Europe announced a collaboration with Pink in 2006, which included a limited edition "P!nk PSP Value Pack". On April 3, 2009, Optus announced a Pre-Paid mobile campaign with the singer. The following year, Pink fronted a multi-million dollar TV campaign for V8 Supercars Australia. She served as their ambassador until 2012. In August 2012, Pink became a spokesmodel for CoverGirl, featuring in a fall 2013 advertising campaign themed "beauty with an edge".

In January 2023, the singer's endorsement was featured in a Pfizer commercial alongside Questlove, Jean Smart, and Michael Phelps, as part of a campaign to remind the public of the availability of COVID-19 products. During April 2025, Pink was added to the Funko Pop! line of vinyl figurine collectables. Her figurine is inspired by her 2023 Trustfall album and tour, and includes her mohawk hairstyle and corresponding ensemble from the Trustfall tour.

=== Wealth ===
In 2010, she appeared on Forbes' "The Celebrity 100" list at number 27, with earnings of $44 million. In 2011, she appeared on Forbes' The Top-Earning Women in Music list at number 6 with earnings of $22 million, with an average of $1 million per show on the road. In 2009, Billboard put her at number 6 on their "Money Makers" list, listing her earnings as $36,347,658. In 2013, she appeared on Forbes' list of "Highest Paid Musicians", with earnings of $32 million. In 2018, she appeared on Forbes' list of "Highest Paid Female Celebrities", with earnings of $52 million.

== Legacy ==
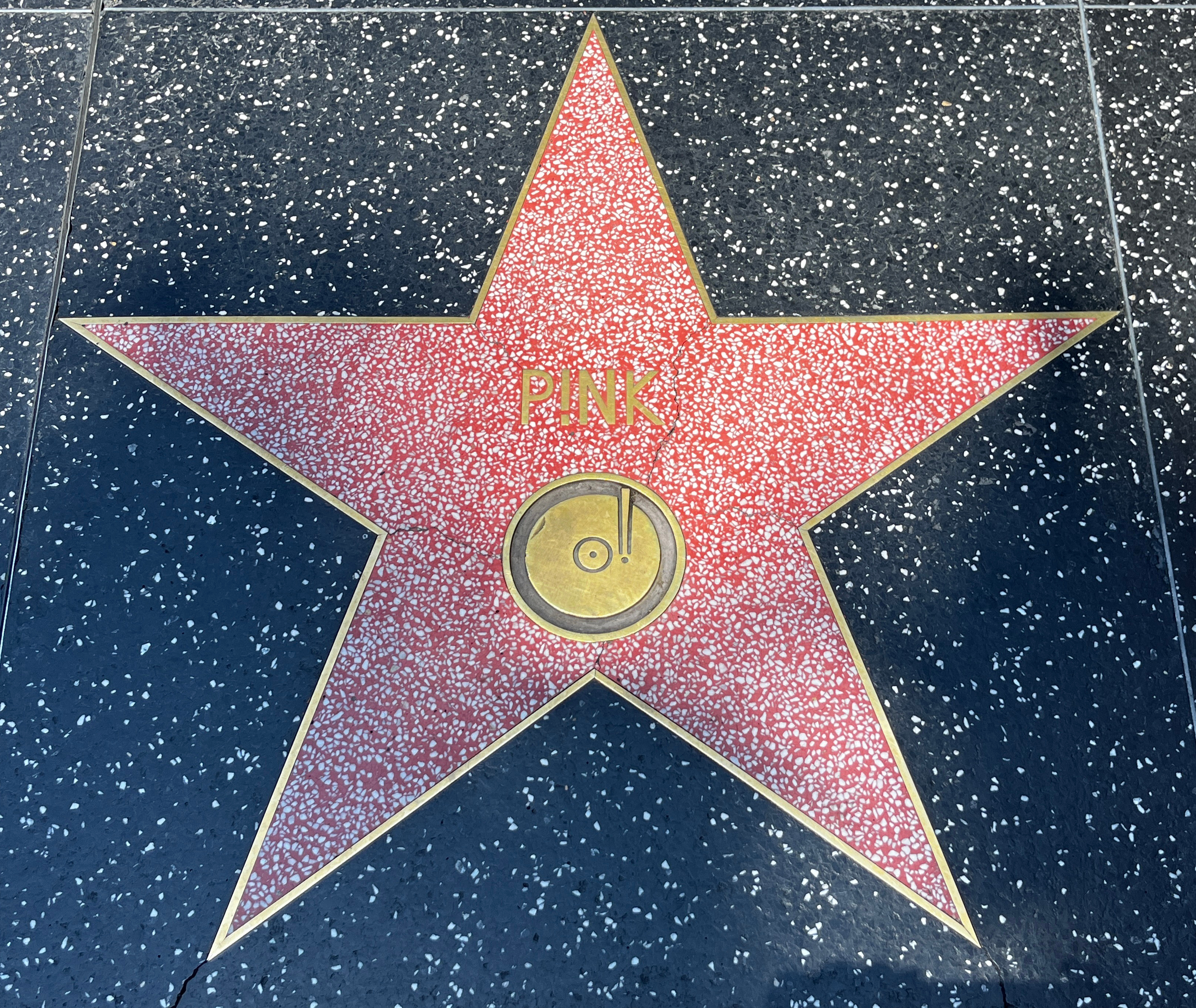
Pink's star of the Hollywood Walk of Fame at 6801 Hollywood Boulevard

She has been called "the most trailblazing artist from the famous teen pop class of circa 1999." Robert Hilburn of the Los Angeles Times says, "Pink stood up for her music, broke the music industry's mold and scored a breakout hit, challenging a school of teen singers to find their own sounds as well." He adds, "[Pink] also started a race among other teen pop stars like Christina Aguilera to add substance to their own sound." Ann Powers refers to her as a "powerhouse vocalist", stating her mix of rebellion, emotional rawness, humor, and "infectious" dance beats created "a model for the mashup approach of latter-day divas such as Katy Perry, Kesha, and Rihanna." Rob Sheffield of Rolling Stone commented: "I think people respond to her sense of independence and dedication. It inspires people... This is a prolific pop artist who is sometimes famous and successful, sometimes obscure, who nonetheless keeps making her own kind of music."

James Montgomery of MTV News describes her as "a fabulously fearless pop artist" who can "out-sing almost anyone out there. She can out-crazy Gaga or Lily. She's the total pop-star package, everything you'd want in a singer/entertainer/icon. And still, she remains oddly off the radar. Such is the price of busting borders". Entertainment Weekly said: "She essentially invented the whole modern wave of Pop Diva Domination: You can draw a straight line from 'Get This Party Started' to Katy Perry, Kesha, pre-messianic Lady Gaga, and post-weird Rihanna." Glamour Magazine wrote: "When Pennsylvania-born Alecia Moore debuted in 2000, pop was dominated by long-locked blonds like Britney Spears, Christina Aguilera and Jessica Simpson. Pink changed the game. Without her, the last 13 years of big-voiced, tough chick music is hard to imagine."

British soul singer Adele considers Pink's performance at Brixton Academy in London one of "the most defining moments" in her life, saying, "It was the Missundaztood record, so I was about 13 or 14. I had never heard, being in the room, someone sing like that live. I remember sort of feeling like I was in a wind tunnel, her voice just hitting me. It was incredible."

Pink's work has inspired many other artists, including Christina Aguilera, Demi Lovato, Kelly Clarkson, Katy Perry, Tegan and Sara, Ashley Tisdale, Alessia Cara, Victoria Justice, Adele, Julia Michaels, Ben Hopkins of Pwr Bttm, Dua Lipa, Bebe Rexha, Halsey, Anne-Marie, Kehlani, Chappell Roan and Daya.

Aside from her music, Pink has been noted for her fashion style, such as her "adventurous" hairstyles, which have ranged from fluorescent spikes to pink-streaked dreadlocks to a pitch-black skater cut. Billboard described her style as "androgynous" and "gender-bending". She told InStyle, "I'm eclectic. I'm a tomboy, but I'm kind of a hippie and kind of a gangster ... I don't know if that's a good thing, but it is my thing."

== Personal life ==
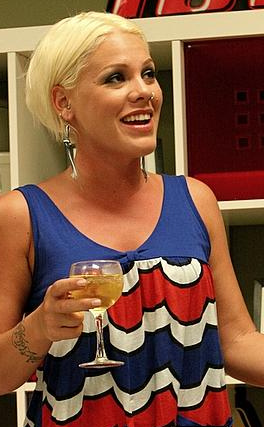
Pink in 2006

Pink met professional motocross racer Carey Hart at the 2001 X Games in Philadelphia. Following a brief separation in 2003, Pink proposed to Hart in June 2005 during a Mammoth Lakes motocross race; she was "assisting" in his race and wrote "Will U Marry Me?" on a pit board. He either did not notice or ignored it and continued for another lap. Then Pink added "Serious!" to the board, and he pulled off the track to accept. She then made him finish the race. They married in Costa Rica on January 7, 2006.

After months of speculation, Pink announced in February 2008 that she and Hart had separated. Hart subsequently appeared in the video for her 2008 song "So What", which deals with their separation. The couple sought marriage counseling during their separation in hopes of reconciliation. In May 2009, Pink confirmed that she and Hart were back together. Hart also appears with Pink in the videos for her songs "Just Like a Pill" (from her 2001 album Missundaztood), "Just Give Me a Reason", "True Love" (both from her 2012 album The Truth About Love), "Just Like Fire" (from the soundtrack to the 2016 film Alice Through the Looking Glass), "90 Days" (from her 2019 album Hurts 2B Human) and "All I Know So Far" (from her 2021 live album All I Know So Far: Setlist). People and Us Weekly incorrectly claimed that Pink and Hart separated again in February 2026; the singer criticized both outlets for spreading misinformation.

In November 2010, Pink announced on The Ellen DeGeneres Show that she and Hart were expecting their first child. In June 2011, she gave birth to their daughter, Willow Sage. In 2018, Willow released a cover of the reprise of "A Million Dreams (Reprise)" for The Greatest Showman: Reimagined soundtrack, and in 2021, she released "Cover Me in Sunshine" with her mother. In December 2016, Pink gave birth to their second child, a son. Pink is a supporter of attachment parenting.

In 2019, Pink revealed to Carson Daly that she struggles with anxiety and depression. The singer had a miscarriage when she was 17. She revealed that her song "Long Way to Happy" was written about surviving sexual abuse by a police officer when she was a teen.

On April 4, 2020, amid the COVID-19 pandemic, Pink announced that she and her three-year-old son showed symptoms for COVID-19 and she subsequently tested positive, but fully recovered. She has had asthma her whole life, and the initial days of fighting the virus exacerbated her condition.

== Achievements ==
Pink has three Grammy Awards, two Brit Awards (including Outstanding Contribution to Music), a Daytime Emmy Award and seven MTV Video Music Awards (including the Michael Jackson Video Vanguard Award). Billboard named her Woman of the Year in 2013. Pink received the BMI President's Award for "her outstanding achievement in songwriting and global impact on pop culture and the entertainment industry." In 2019, the singer received a star on the Hollywood Walk of Fame. She was also named as Pollstar's 2019 Artist of the Year. Following the success of The Beautiful Trauma Tour, Pink accepted the Legend of Live Award at the Billboard Live Music Summit. Three years later, Pink received the Icon Award at the Billboard Music Awards.

In 2023, iHeartRadio Music Awards awarded the singer with the Icon Award to recognize her "impact on pop culture, longevity and continued relevance as a touring and radio force with a loyal fan base worldwide." She was additionally honored by the Songwriters of North America for her achievement in the industry and her activism efforts. Pink has also been nominated for the Songwriters Hall of Fame and Rock and Roll Hall of Fame. In 2026, the singer received the NMPA Songwriter Icon Award.

According to Nielsen SoundScan, Pink's record sales stand at 16 million copies in the United States. Pink has sold over 60 million albums and 75 million singles worldwide, making her one of the world's best-selling music artists. Billboard included the singer in its list of Greatest of All Time Pop Songs Artists (2018) at number two and named her one of the 100 most successful artists of the 2010s by including her in its Top Artists of the 2010s Chart (2019). She was also ranked at number 7 on the magazine's 2025 "Top 100 Women Artists of the 21st Century" list and chosen as an honorable mention for their "The 25 Greatest Pop Stars of the 21st Century" list. Billboard additionally included her second album Missundaztood among the Greatest of All Time Billboard 200 Albums (2015) list at number 157. Phonographic Performance Limited (PPL) announced in 2021, that Pink was the most-played female artist of the 21st century in the United Kingdom. In 2025, Pollstar ranked her at number 11 on their "Most Popular Touring Artists Of The Millennium" list and number 2 on their "The Millennium's Most Popular Women In Touring" list.

== Discography ==
- Can't Take Me Home (2000)
- Missundaztood (2001)
- Try This (2003)
- I'm Not Dead (2006)
- Funhouse (2008)
- The Truth About Love (2012)
- Beautiful Trauma (2017)
- Hurts 2B Human (2019)
- Trustfall (2023)

== Filmography ==
| Year | Title | Role | Notes |
|---|---|---|---|
| 2000 | Ski to the Max | Brena | Credited as Alecia Moore |
| 2000 | Soul Train Lady of Soul Awards | Co-host | |
| 2002 | Rollerball | Rock singer | Cameo, credited as Alecia Moore |
| 2003 | Charlie's Angels: Full Throttle | Coal Bowl M.C. | Cameo, credited as Alecia Moore |
| 2006 | Pink: Live in Europe | Herself | Live music DVD |
| 2007 | Live from Wembley Arena, London, England | Herself | Live music DVD |
| 2007 | Catacombs | Carolyn | Credited as Alecia Moore |
| 2009 | The People Speak | Herself | Performed "Dear Mr. President" |
| 2009 | SpongeBob SquarePants | Herself | Episode: "SpongeBob's Truth or Square" |
| 2009 | Funhouse Tour: Live in Australia | Herself | Live music DVD |
| 2010 | Get Him to the Greek | Herself | Cameo |
| 2011 | Happy Feet Two | Gloria | Voice, credited as Alecia Moore |
| 2012 | Thanks for Sharing | Dede | Credited as Alecia Moore |
| 2013 | The Truth About Love Tour: Live From Melbourne | Herself | Live music DVD |
| 2015 | Janis: Little Girl Blue | Herself | |
| 2016 | Popstar: Never Stop Never Stopping | Herself | |
| 2016 | The Voice | Mentor | Episode 25 |
| 2017 | On The Record: P!NK – Beautiful Trauma | Herself | Short documentary for Apple Music |
| 2020 | Miss Americana | Herself | Cameo, uncredited |
| 2021 | Pink: All I Know So Far | Herself | |
| 2021 | Reno 911!: The Hunt for QAnon | Herself | Cameo, credited as Alecia Moore |
| 2024 | Bob Mackie: Naked Illusion | Herself | |
| 2025 | Billy Joel: And So It Goes | Herself | |
| 2026 | The Kelly Clarkson Show | Guest Host | |
| 2026 | 79th Tony Awards | Host | |
| 2026 | Sara Bareilles: Good Grief | Executive producer | |

== Tours ==
- Party Tour (2002)
- Try This Tour (2004)
- I'm Not Dead Tour (2006–2007)
- Funhouse Tour (2009)
- The Funhouse Summer Carnival Tour (2010)
- The Truth About Love Tour (2013–2014)
- Beautiful Trauma World Tour (2018–2019)
- Summer Carnival (2023–2024)
- Trustfall Tour (2023–2024)
- Live at Sphere (2027)
