= Fuckin' Perfect =

2010 single by Pink

Single by Pink

from the album Greatest Hits... So Far!!!
- Released: December 14, 2010
- Studio: Woodshed Recording (Malibu, California)
- Genre: Pop rock; soft rock
- Length: 3:33
- Label: LaFace; Jive
- Songwriters: Pink; Max Martin; Karl Johan Schuster
- Producers: Max Martin; Shellback

Pink singles chronology
"Raise Your Glass" (2010)	"Fuckin' Perfect" (2010)	"Bridge of Light" (2011)

Music videos
- "Fuckin' Perfect (Explicit)" on YouTube; "Perfect" on YouTube

"Fuckin' Perfect" (stylised as "F**KIN' PERFECT") or "Perfect" (for the clean version) is a song by American singer Pink from her first greatest hits album Greatest Hits... So Far!!! (2010). Written by Pink along with its producers Max Martin and Shellback, the track is a pop rock power ballad that encourages people to accept each other for their true identities. Pink has stated that the main inspiration behind the track is her husband, Carey Hart.

"Fuckin' Perfect" was released on December 14, 2010, by Jive Records as the album's second single. It peaked at number two on the US Billboard Hot 100, becoming Pink's eleventh top-10 single in the United States. The song also peaked at number two in Canada, Hungary, New Zealand, and Poland. Its music video, directed by longtime collaborator Dave Meyers, delivers a message against depression, self-harm, and suicide. In November 2011, the song garnered a Grammy Award nomination for Best Pop Solo Performance, but lost to Adele's "Someone like You" (2011).

== Background and composition ==
"Fuckin' Perfect" was written by Pink, Max Martin and Shellback and produced by Martin and Shellback. The Swedish pair has collaborated with Pink on several of her previous hits including "So What", "Please Don't Leave Me", and "Raise Your Glass". The song is a pop rock and soft rock ballad track containing elements contemporary R&B. It is written in the key of G major in common time with a tempo of 92 beats per minute, featuring guitar, crashing cymbals, simple synth drum beats and a reverberating string section. The song follows the I–V–vi–IV progression (G–D–Em–C), and Pink's vocal range spanning from G_{3} to D_{5}. A clean version recorded for radio is titled "Perfect".

== Critical reception ==
Bill Lamb of About.com gave the song 4.5 out of 5 stars, praising the "Serious but uplifting lyrics", commenting: "It has just enough edginess to move Pink away from bland middle of the road territory. Finally, the melody and arrangement make the song instantly memorable and familiar."

== Chart performance ==
On the issue dated February 2, 2011, "Fuckin' Perfect" reached number two on the Billboard Hot 100, behind "Grenade" by Bruno Mars. It became Pink's eleventh top 10 hit in the United States. The song reached number 1 on the Hot Digital Songs chart, with 241,000 copies sold, making it her second song to top that chart, after "So What" in 2008. Despite the false predictions for the February 19 issue and the song's descent on the Hot 100, Billboard chart experts considered the song a nominee to become the chart's 1,000th number 1 song in its 52-year history, it competed against Lady Gaga's "Born This Way" and the Glee Cast's, who also covered the song later, nine tracks that were released digitally following the February 6 and February 8 episodes. The February 26 issue of the Hot 100 revealed that "Born This Way" earned the milestone, debuting atop the chart and becoming its 1,000th number 1 song. On the Billboard chart week of March 26, 2011, "Fuckin' Perfect" reached number one on both the Pop Songs and Adult Pop Songs charts, which at the time, gave Pink the record for most number ones on both charts. On Pop Songs, Pink ties Lady Gaga for second most number 1's with seven, while on Adult Pop Songs she ties Nickelback for the most, with five number 1 hits.

The song held the Digital Gainer certification for three consecutive weeks, the longest streak since Leona Lewis' "Bleeding Love" (2008). It continues its Airplay chart ascent and has so far peaked at number 4 with 55 million impressions and has so far collected more than two million digital units in the USA. In the week ending March 12, 2011, the song jumped from number 6 to number 4 making it the first time that two songs including the word "fuck" in their titles are in the top 5 as "Fuck You" by CeeLo Green was number 2 in that week, too. The song has sold over 3 million downloads as of May 2013.

On November 28, 2010, the song debuted at number 10 in Australia, coinciding with the release of her greatest hits album, Greatest Hits... So Far!!!. The song's charting gave Pink her eighteenth top ten single in the country. It has since been certified gold by the Australian Recording Industry Association for sales of 35,000 units. In the United Kingdom, the song debuted at number 71 on the chart issued on November 27, 2010. The next week the song dropped out of the chart, but re-entered at number 21 with the release of its music video and before peaking at number 10 on February 27, 2011. The song topped German airplay charts, becoming Pink's eighth consecutive single to do so and increasing her previously broken record for the most consecutive number one singles in Germany.

The song met a commercial success elsewhere but a little less than "Raise Your Glass", although peaking in the top five in Denmark, Germany and Austria, top twenty in Switzerland, Belgium and Russia, top thirty in Sweden and France and top forty in the Netherlands.

== Music video ==
=== Background ===
Filming of the music video began on December 5, 2010, during Pink's first few weeks of pregnancy. The music video focuses primarily on the life of a woman who overcame several struggles to become a successful artist. The lead role was played by Tina Majorino, as confirmed by Pink via Twitter and Facebook, describing her as "insanely talented".

"Fuckin' Perfect" was directed by Dave Meyers, who worked with Pink on twelve videos before, including her VMA winner "Stupid Girls". It premiered on January 19, 2011, on MTV and Pink's official channel.

=== Reception ===
Billboard talked about the video in two different, and largely positive, reviews and described it as "controversial", saying, "Choosing to title her new single 'Fuckin' Perfect' and then open its video with graphic depictions of sex and bloody scenarios of cutting and suicide, P!nk knew her latest projects would ignite controversy. And that's just the way she wants it, because in this particular case, the 31-year-old singer's in-your-face approach is to ensure the message in the music isn't lost or ignored."

In the second review, Monica Herrera begins saying, "If P!nk's new music video for 'Fuckin' Perfect' doesn't make you cry or cringe at some point, you've got thicker skin than we do." She also commented on a particular scene in the video, adding, "Pink video's story directly just once, when she toasts to the girl's newfound happiness from across a crowded room...and it's enough to make you want to raise your glass right along with them."

MTV praised the video, giving a "hats off" to Pink, while saying the video was a "moving call to awareness about a growing problem surrounding depression, numbness and powerlessness that leads to cutting and suicide. Her intention, as usual, is to ruffle a few feathers and shake a few sleepers as she points out 'You can't move mountains by whispering at them.'" The video was nominated for Best Video with a Message at the 2011 MTV Video Music Awards, but eventually lost to Lady Gaga's "Born This Way". In France, the uncensored version of the music video of Fuckin' Perfect was broadcast after 10pm in France due to the content of it which made the song (violence, bullying, self-harming...). French music videos would broadcast then the censored music video or with blurring and with a warning -10.

== Track listings ==
All tracks written by Pink, Max Martin, and Shellback.

Digital single
No.	Title	Producer(s)	Length
1.	"F**kin' Perfect"	Max Martin; Shellback	3:23
2.	"Whataya Want from Me"	Martin; Shellback	3:46
3.	"Perfect" (clean version)	Martin; Shellback	3:33

Australian digital download EP
No.	Title	Length
4.	"F**kin' Perfect" (music video)	4:07

German CD single
No.	Title	Producer(s)	Length
1.	"F**kin' Perfect"	Martin; Shellback	3:23
2.	"Whataya Want from Me"	Martin; Shellback	3:46

== Personnel ==
Credits lifted from the liner notes of "Fuckin' Perfect."

- Vocals, songwriting – Pink, Max Martin, Shellback
- Production and recording – Max Martin, Shellback
- Keyboards – Max Martin
- Drums, guitar and bass – Shellback

- Assistant recording – Sal "El Rey" Ojeda
- Mixing – Serban Ghenea
- Mix engineer – John Hanes
- Assistant mix engineer – Tim Roberts

== Charts ==
=== Weekly charts ===
Weekly chart performance for "Fuckin' Perfect"
Chart (2010–11)	Peak position
Australia (ARIA)	10
Austria (Ö3 Austria Top 40)	9
Belgium (Ultratop 50 Flanders)	16
Belgium (Ultratop 50 Wallonia)	29
Brazil (Billboard Hot 100)	21
Brazil (Billboard Hot Pop Songs)	14
Canada (Canadian Hot 100)	2
CIS Airplay (TopHit)	14
Croatia International Airplay (HRT)	5
Czech Republic Airplay (ČNS IFPI)	6
Denmark (Tracklisten)	4
France (SNEP)	24
Germany (GfK)	7
Greece (IFPI)	29
Hungary (Rádiós Top 40)	2
Ireland (IRMA)	15
Netherlands (Dutch Top 40)	6
Netherlands (Single Top 100)	31
New Zealand (Recorded Music NZ)	2
Poland (ZPAV)	2
Portugal Digital Song Sales (Billboard)	6
Russia Airplay (TopHit)	17
Scottish Singles Sales (Official Charts)	7
Slovakia Airplay (ČNS IFPI)	6
Sweden (Sverigetopplistan)	23
Switzerland (Schweizer Hitparade)	15
UK Singles (Official Charts)	10
Ukraine Airplay (TopHit)	34
US Billboard Hot 100	2
US Adult Contemporary (Billboard)	2
US Adult Pop Airplay (Billboard)	1
US Pop Airplay (Billboard)	1
US Rhythmic Airplay (Billboard)	35

=== Year-end charts ===
2010 year-end chart performance for "Fuckin' Perfect"
Chart (2010)	Position
Australia (ARIA)	93

2011 year-end chart performance for "Fuckin' Perfect"
Chart (2011)	Position
Canada (Canadian Hot 100)	13
Croatia International Airplay (HRT)	25
Denmark (Tracklisten)	42
Germany (Official German Charts)	94
Hungary (Rádiós Top 40)	27
Netherlands (Dutch Top 40)	30
New Zealand (Recorded Music NZ)	45
Russia Airplay (TopHit)	68
Switzerland (Schweizer Hitparade)	70
Ukraine Airplay (TopHit)	66
UK Singles (Official Charts Company)	69
US Billboard Hot 100	19
US Adult Contemporary (Billboard)	5
US Adult Top 40 (Billboard)	3
US Mainstream Top 40 (Billboard)	14

2012 year-end chart performance for "Fuckin' Perfect"
Chart (2012)	Position
US Adult Contemporary (Billboard)	26

== Certifications ==
Certifications for "Fuckin' Perfect"
Region	Certification	Certified units/sales
Australia (ARIA)	5× Platinum	350,000^{‡}
Brazil (Pro-Música Brasil)	Platinum	60,000^{‡}
Canada (Music Canada)	4× Platinum	320,000^{‡}
Denmark (IFPI Danmark)	Platinum	90,000^{‡}
Germany (BVMI)	Gold	150,000^{‡}
Japan (RIAJ)	Gold	100,000^{*}
New Zealand (RMNZ)	2× Platinum	60,000^{‡}
Sweden (GLF)	Platinum	40,000^{‡}
United Kingdom (BPI)	Platinum	600,000^{‡}
Streaming
Denmark (IFPI Danmark)	Gold	900,000^{†}
^{*} Sales figures based on certification alone.^{‡} Sales+streaming figures based on certification alone.^{†} Streaming-only figures based on certification alone.

== Release history ==
=== Radio adds ===
Release dates and formats for "Fuckin' Perfect"
Region	Date	Format	Ref.
Australia	November 12, 2010	Contemporary hit radio	
United States	January 4, 2011	Contemporary hit radio	
Brazil	January 28, 2011	Mainstream	

=== Purchasable release ===
Release dates and formats for "Fuckin' Perfect"
Region	Date	Format	Label	Ref.
United States	December 14, 2010	Digital download	LaFace Records	
Canada	December 24, 2010	Digital EP	LaFace Records	
Germany	February 18, 2011	CD single; digital download	LaFace Records	
United Kingdom	February 21, 2011	CD single; digital download	LaFace Records	
