= Today's the Day (Pink song) =

Single by Pink
- Released: September 10, 2015
- Genre: Pop
- Length: 3:44
- Label: RCA; Warner Bros
- Songwriter(s): Alecia Moore; Greg Kurstin
- Producer(s): Greg Kurstin

Pink singles chronology
"Are We All We Are" (2013)	"Today's the Day" (2015)	"Just Like Fire" (2016)

"Today's the Day" is a pop song written and recorded by American singer-songwriter Pink to serve as the new theme song for season 13 of The Ellen DeGeneres Show. The song was co-written and produced by Greg Kurstin. It was released to digital retailers as an official single on September 10, 2015, through RCA Records and Warner Bros.

At the 43rd Daytime Creative Arts Emmy Awards the song won for Outstanding Promotional Announcement – Image.

== Composition ==
"Today's the Day" is a song written by Pink and Greg Kurstin with inspirational lyrics about seizing the day and not wanting to let it end. The song has been praised for combining Pink's signature sound with the show's "feel-good vibe", but has also been noted as overly-familiar thematic territory for the singer.

== Live performances ==
Pink performed the song live on the September 10, 2015 episode of The Ellen DeGeneres Show, which for premiere week was being shot in New York City.

== Charts ==
=== Weekly charts ===
Chart (2015)	Peak position
Australia (ARIA)	11
Austria (Ö3 Austria Top 40)	53
Belgium (Ultratip Bubbling Under Flanders)	7
Belgium (Ultratip Bubbling Under Wallonia)	11
Canada (Canadian Hot 100)	42
Canada AC (Billboard)	21
Canada Hot AC (Billboard)	15
France (SNEP)	69
Germany (GfK)	76
Hungary (Rádiós Top 40)	4
Slovakia (Rádio Top 100)	8
Slovenia (SloTop50)	4
Switzerland (Schweizer Hitparade)	48
US Bubbling Under Hot 100 Singles (Billboard)	17

=== Year-end charts ===
Chart (2015)	Position
Hungary (Rádiós Top 40)	49
Chart (2016)	Position
Hungary (Rádiós Top 40)	92
Slovenia (SloTop50)	27

== Certifications ==
Region	Certification	Certified units/sales
Australia (ARIA)	Platinum	70,000^{‡}
^{‡} Sales+streaming figures based on certification alone.
