= Bridge of Light (song) =

Single by Pink

from the album Happy Feet Two
- B-side: "Dinner a La Sven"
- Released: December 2, 2011
- Length: 4:05
- Label: WaterTower
- Songwriters: Pink; Billy Mann
- Producer: Billy Mann

Pink singles chronology
"Fuckin' Perfect" (2010)	"Bridge of Light" (2011)	"Blow Me (One Last Kiss)" (2012)

Music video
- "Bridge of Light" on YouTube

"Bridge of Light" is a song by American singer-songwriter Pink. It was released on December 2, 2011 by Sony Music. The song was written by Pink and long-time collaborator Billy Mann and serves as the theme song to the 2011 film Happy Feet Two. The song was a moderate success and became a top 10 hit in Austria, Germany, and Switzerland but failed to chart high in other countries due to minimal promotion.

== Composition ==
This song is written in F major, but in the last chorus, the key goes up to G major.

== Track listing ==
CD single and digital download

1. "Bridge of Light" (Pink featuring Happy Feet Two Chorus) – 4:06
2. "Dinner a La Sven" (Sydney Scoring Orchestra, Fiona Ziegler, Sun Yi and Cantillation Choir) – 3:34

== Charts ==
Chart (2011)	Peak position
Australia (ARIA)	26
Austria (Ö3 Austria Top 40)	7
Belgium (Ultratip Bubbling Under Flanders)	3
Germany (GfK)	8
Germany Airplay (BVMI)	2
Switzerland (Schweizer Hitparade)	8

== Certifications ==
Region	Certification	Certified units/sales
Australia (ARIA)	Platinum	70,000^{‡}
Germany (BVMI)	Gold	150,000^{^}
^{^} Shipments figures based on certification alone.^{‡} Sales+streaming figures based on certification alone.
