= Share Our Strength =

American charitable organization

- Abbreviation: SOS
- Formation: 1984
- Type: Non-profit
- Legal status: 501(c)(3)
- Purpose: To end child hunger.
- Headquarters: Washington, DC
- Region served: United States (w/ some international grants funding)
- Budget: $56.18 million (2017)
- Website: nokidhungry.org
- Remarks: Share Our Strength serves dual purposes of helping to end child hunger through both state partnerships, field work, and granting money to other hunger-oriented non-profit organizations.

Share Our Strength is a national organization working to end childhood hunger and poverty in the United States. Share Our Strength holds culinary events, solicits individual donations, and uses social media to raise funds, which are then used to fund long-term solutions to the hunger problem. Through corporate sponsorships, Share Our Strength funds are significantly magnified. No Kid Hungry is a national campaign run by Share Our Strength.

== History ==
Share Our Strength was founded in 1984 by brother and sister Billy and Debbie Shore, who continue to lead the organization today. It "began in the basement of a row house on Capitol Hill", and from the beginning, it was focused on looking for long-term solutions to seemingly eternal problems. During these early years, Share Our Strength focused almost exclusively on fundraising and granted its funds out entirely to other nonprofit organizations.

In 2010, the organization launched the No Kid Hungry campaign, which proved to be not only a powerful engine for raising money and awareness, but an effective way to work directly with programs on the ground.

=== Timeline ===
- 1984: Share Our Strength was founded.
- 1988: Taste of the Nation was born, raising nearly $250,000 in its first event.
- 1993: Operation Frontline (now Cooking Matters) began, and Share Our Strength started moving away from being 100% grant-making.
- 1997: Community Wealth Ventures, a for-profit subsidiary of Share Our Strength, opened its doors.
- 2003: The Great American Bake Sale first started selling baked goods across the country.
- 2004: On Share Our Strength's 20th anniversary, the mission was changed to focus directly on ending child hunger.
- 2006: Share Our Strength started its first state partnership pilot with the District of Columbia.
- 2007: Share Our Strength partnered with the Centers for Disease Control and Prevention to address childhood hunger and obesity.
- 2008: Share Our Strength unveiled its new brand identity and hosted the first Dine Out for No Kid Hungry.
- 2010: Share Our Strength launched the No Kid Hungry campaign.

== Awards ==
- Culinary Hall of Fame Induction
- In 2011, Bill Shore received the S. Roger Horchow Award for Greatest Public Service by a Private Citizen, an award given out annually by Jefferson Awards.
