= All I Know So Far (disambiguation) =

Pink: All I Know So Far is a 2021 documentary film about American singer-songwriter Pink.

All I Know So Far may also refer to:

- "All I Know So Far" (song), by Pink, 2021
- All I Know So Far: Setlist, the 2021 soundtrack to the film
