= Pink: All I Know So Far =

2021 American documentary film

- Directed by: Michael Gracey
- Written by: Jory Anast; Michael Gracey; Cindy Mollo; Pink
- Produced by: Michael Gracey; Isabella Parish
- Starring: Pink; Carey Hart; Willow Sage Hart; Cher
- Cinematography: David Spearing
- Edited by: Brad Comfort; Cindy Mollo; Larn Poland
- Music by: Pink
- Production companies: Sony Music; RCA Records; Luminaries; Silent House; Lefty Paw Print
- Distributed by: Amazon Studios
- Release date: May 21, 2021
- Running time: 99 minutes
- Country: United States
- Language: English

Pink: All I Know So Far is a 2021 documentary film centering on American singer-songwriter Pink, directed by Michael Gracey. It was released on Amazon Prime Video on May 21, 2021. The documentary soundtrack All I Know So Far: Setlist, published through RCA Records, features the single "All I Know So Far" nominated for the Grammy Award for Best Song Written for Visual Media.

== Summary ==
The film follows Pink on her Beautiful Trauma World Tour, as she balances being a performer with her role as a mother, wife, and boss. It mixes footage from the road, behind-the-scenes interviews, and personal material. On the tour, Pink played 156 shows in 18 countries. The film is produced by Michael Gracey and Isabella Parish, with Luminaries, Silent House, and Lefty Paw Print.

== Soundtrack ==
The documentary soundtrack, All I Know So Far: Setlist, was published as the second live album by Pink on May 21, 2021, by RCA Records. It was promoted by singles "Cover Me in Sunshine" and "All I Know So Far".

== Release ==
On March 18, 2021, Amazon Studios announced that the film will be released on Amazon Prime Video on May 21, 2021. The premiere was attended at the Hollywood Bowl in Los Angeles, California, on May 17, 2021.

== Reception ==
=== Critical reception ===
The review aggregator website Rotten Tomatoes surveyed 29 critics and, categorizing the reviews as positive or negative, assessed 19 as positive and 10 as negative for a 66% rating. Reviewing the film for The Hollywood Reporter, Lovia Gyarkye described the film as "an endearing — if not fully revealing — love letter to family and fans". In a less favorable review for The Guardian, Phil Hoad said of the film: "There is little narrative... and, more crucially, little conflict, outer or inner."

Martha Sorren of Refinery29 highlighted the role that fathers can share in equal parenting: "That pull between Rock Star Pink and Mom Pink is the focus of the documentary, but it's the quiet, family moments between concert scenes that really make it."

=== Accolades ===
Award	Date of ceremony	Category	Recipient(s)	Result	Ref.
Make-Up Artists & Hair Stylists Guild Awards	December 19，22	Best Make-Up in a Commercials and Music Videos	Barney Burman, Bart Mixon and Chloe Sens	Nominated	
People's Choice Awards	December 7, 2021	The Pop Special of the Year	Pink: All I Know So Far	Nominated	
