= All I Know So Far: Setlist =

Live album / soundtrack album by Pink
- Released: May 21, 2021
- Recorded: 2009, 2017, 2019
- Length: 69:01
- Label: RCA
- Producers: A Strut; Jeff Bhasker; Greg Kurstin; Steve Mac; Pink

Pink chronology
Hurts 2B Human (2019)	All I Know So Far: Setlist (2021)	Trustfall (2023)

Singles from All I Know So Far: Setlist
- 1. "Cover Me in Sunshine" Released: February 12, 2021; 2. "All I Know So Far" Released: May 7, 2021

All I Know So Far: Setlist is the second live album by American singer Pink; it is also the soundtrack to the documentary film Pink: All I Know So Far about the Beautiful Trauma World Tour. It was released on May 21, 2021, by RCA Records. It was promoted by singles "Cover Me in Sunshine" and "All I Know So Far", the latter nominated at the 64th Annual Grammy Awards for Best Song Written for Visual Media.

== Background and release ==
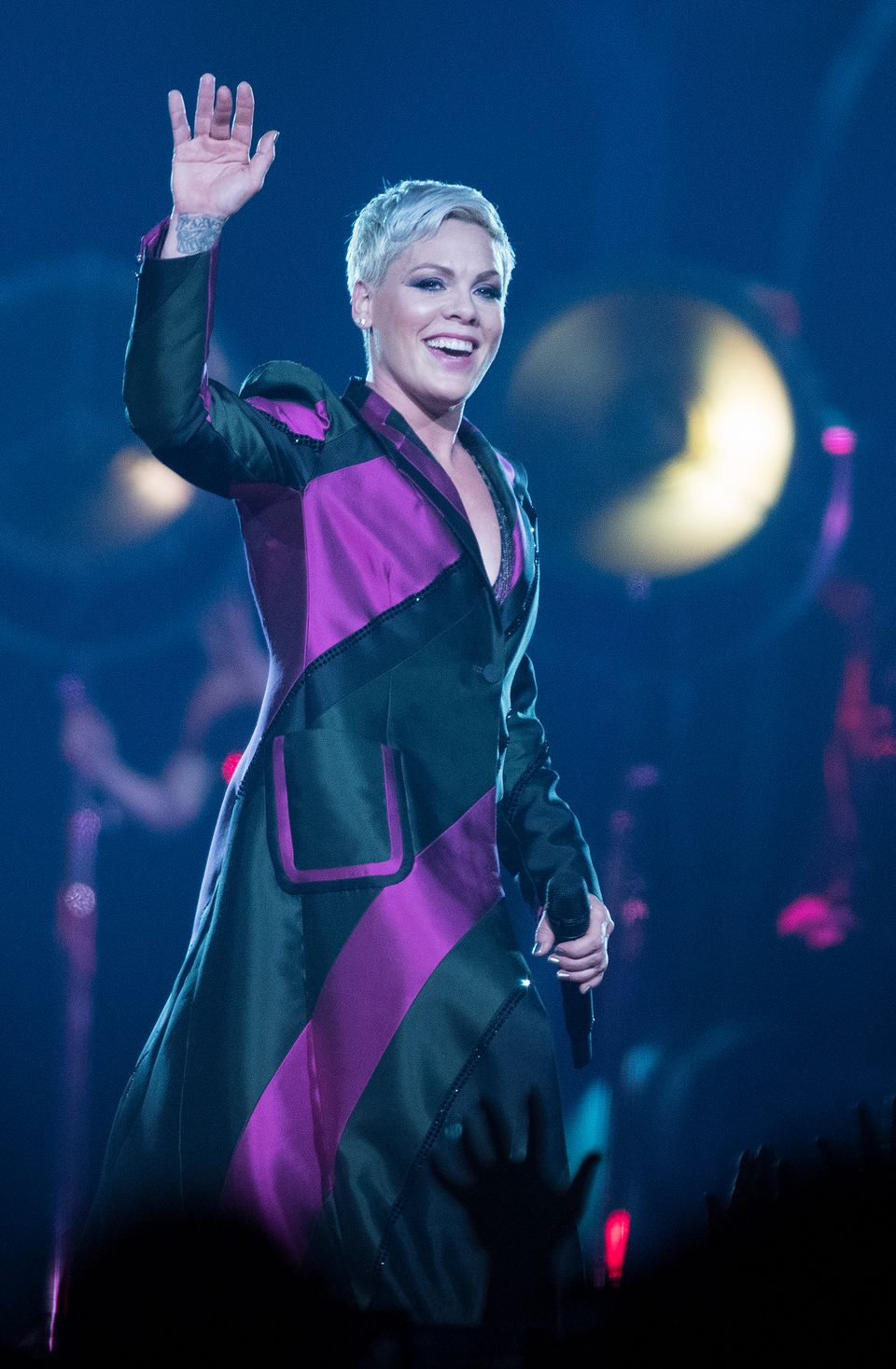
Pink performing at the Beautiful Trauma World Tour in 2018

After the end of the Beautiful Trauma World Tour (2018−2019), promotional tour for studio albums Beautiful Trauma (2017) and Hurts 2B Human (2019), Pink published the single "Cover Me in Sunshine" with her daughter Willow Sage Hart on February 12, 2021. On April 29, 2021 Pink announced the single "All I Know So Far" and the documentary film Pink: All I Know So Far, directed by Michael Gracey, which recounts the behind-the-scenes stories and performances of the tour, with contributions from the artist herself, her family, guest artists and tour technicians. Pink also announced the documentary official soundtrack album, All I Know So Far: Setlist, was published through RCA Records and features sixteen songs from live performances recorded throughout the tour, including at the Wembley Stadium in London, United Kingdom.

The live album also features the two previously released singles and the artist's speech upon receiving the Michael Jackson Video Vanguard Award at the 2017 MTV Video Music Awards. Pink also included three covers of "Time After Time" by Cyndi Lauper, "Just a Girl" by No Doubt, "River" by Bishop Briggs and "Bohemian Rhapsody"/"We Are the Champions" by Queen.

== Critical reception ==
Professional ratings
Review scores
Source	Rating
AllMusic	4/5 stars
Pitchfork	6.0/10

Neil Z. Yeung of AllMusic describe the album as "As one of pop's most reliable workhorses, All I Know So Far is a showcase for Pink's hit-packed career and, as she sings on set-closer "So What", her position as a tried-and-true rock star". Dani Blum of Pitchfork wrote that "the narrative P!nk wants to tell is that she’s a renegade, as she cooes on the title track, rooted in female empowerment, and that she’s stayed ahead of the times".

== Track listing ==
All I Know So Far: Setlist track listing
No.	Title	Writer(s)	Producer(s)	Length
1.	"Just Like a Pill" (live at Wembley Stadium, June 2019)	Alecia Moore; Dallas Austin	Pink	4:04
2.	"Who Knew" (live at Wembley Stadium, June 2019)	Moore; Lukasz "Doctor Luke" Gottwald; Max Martin	Pink	3:32
3.	"Funhouse" / "Just a Girl" (live at Wembley Stadium, June 2019)	Moore; Gwen Stefani; Jimmy Harry; Thomas Dumont; Tony Kanal	Pink	6:18
4.	"River" (live at Wembley Stadium, June 2019)	Ian Scott; Mark Andress Jackson; Sarah McLaughlin	Pink	3:36
5.	"Just Give Me a Reason" (live at Wembley Stadium, June 2019) (featuring Nate Ruess)	Moore; Jeff Bhasker; Ruess	Bhasker; Pink	4:38
6.	"Time After Time" (live at Wembley Stadium, June 2019)	Cyndi Lauper; Robert Hyman	Pink	3:26
7.	"Walk Me Home" (live at Wembley Stadium, June 2019)	Moore; Scott Harris; Ruess	Pink	2:57
8.	"I Am Here" (live at Wembley Stadium, June 2019)	Moore; Billy Mann; Christian Medice	Pink	5:28
9.	"Fuckin' Perfect" (live at Wembley Stadium, June 2019)	Moore; Martin; Shellback	Pink	4:03
10.	"MTV Video Vanguard Award Speech"			2:16
11.	"Cash Cash Remix Intro" / "What About Us" (live at Wembley Stadium, June 2019)	Moore; Johnny McDaid; Steve Mac	Mac	7:30
12.	"Cover Me in Sunshine" (with Willow Sage Hart)	Amy Allen; Maureen "Mozella" McDonald	A Strut	2:18
13.	"All I Know So Far"	Moore; Benj Pasek; Justin Paul	Greg Kurstin	4:37
14.	"Bohemian Rhapsody" (live at the Sydney Entertainment Center, 2009)	Freddie Mercury	Pink	5:49
15.	"We Are the Champions" (live at Rock in Rio, 2019)	Mercury	Pink	1:36
16.	"So What" (live at Wembley Stadium, June 2019)	Moore; Martin; Shellback	Pink	6:53
Total length:				69:01

== Charts ==
=== Weekly charts ===
Weekly chart performance for All I Know So Far: Setlist
Chart (2021)	Peak position
Australian Albums (ARIA)	2
Austrian Albums (Ö3 Austria)	6
Belgian Albums (Ultratop Flanders)	4
Belgian Albums (Ultratop Wallonia)	26
Canadian Albums (Billboard)	8
Czech Albums (ČNS IFPI)	19
Dutch Albums (Album Top 100)	8
French Albums (SNEP)	19
German Albums (Offizielle Top 100)	5
Irish Albums (Official Charts)	14
Japanese Download Albums (Billboard Japan)	67
New Zealand Albums (RMNZ)	4
Norwegian Albums (VG-lista)	8
Polish Albums (ZPAV)	37
Portuguese Albums (AFP)	12
Scottish Albums (Official Charts)	5
Spanish Albums (Promusicae)	100
Swiss Albums (Schweizer Hitparade)	2
UK Albums (Official Charts)	4
US Billboard 200	13

=== Year-end charts ===
Year-end chart performance for All I Know So Far: Setlist
Chart (2021)	Position
Australian Albums (ARIA)	30

== Certifications ==
Certifications for All I Know So Far: Setlist
Region	Certification	Certified units/sales
France (SNEP)	Gold	50,000^{‡}
New Zealand (RMNZ)	Gold	7,500^{‡}
^{‡} Sales+streaming figures based on certification alone.

== Release history ==
Release history for All I Know So Far: Setlist
Region	Date	Format(s)	Label	Ref.
Various	May 21, 2021	CD; digital download; streaming; Vinyl	RCA	.
Japan	June 16, 2021	CD	Sony Music Japan	
