= Grammy Award for Best Song Written for Visual Media =

- Awarded for: Quality film/television songs
- Country: United States
- Presented by: National Academy of Recording Arts and Sciences
- First award: 1988 ("Somewhere Out There" from An American Tail)
- Currently held by: Park Hong Jun, Joong Gyu Kwak, Yu Han Lee, Hee Dong Nam, Jeong Hoon Seo, Ejae & Mark Sonnenblick – "Golden" from KPop Demon Hunters (2026)
- Website: grammy.com

The Grammy Award for Best Song Written for Visual Media (including its previous names) is the Grammy Awards awarded to songs written for films, television, video games or other visual media.

Alan Menken has won five awards (out of nine nominations) in this category for his work on the Walt Disney animated films: The Little Mermaid (1989), Beauty and the Beast (1991), Aladdin (1992), Pocahontas (1995), and Tangled (2010). Randy Newman has won three awards (out of seven nominations) for his work on the Disney-Pixar films Toy Story 2 (1999), Monsters, Inc. (2001) and Cars (2006). Diane Warren has received the most nominations with 11 in this category, winning once.

== Recipients ==
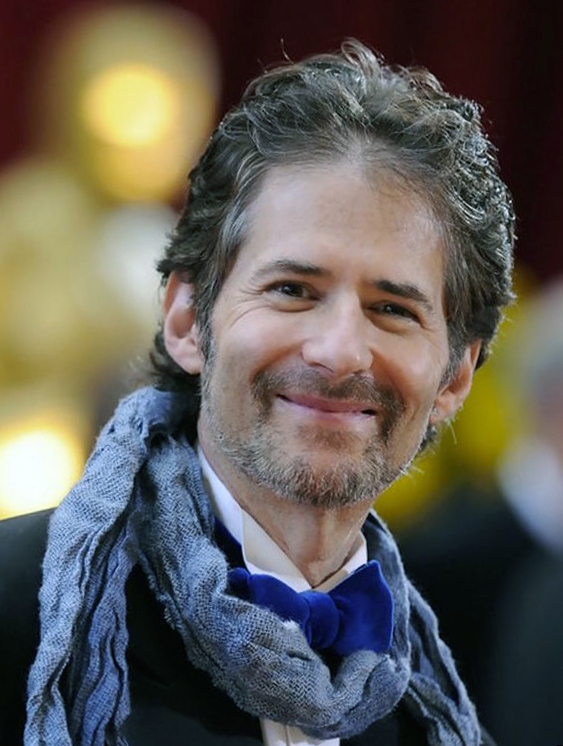
Two-time winner James Horner was the first recipient of the award alongside Barry Mann and Cynthia Weil.

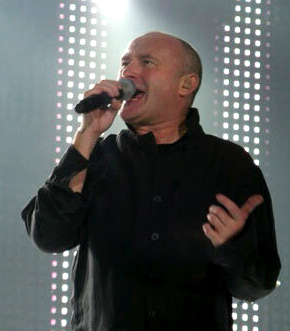
Phil Collins won in 1989 with Lamont Dozier.

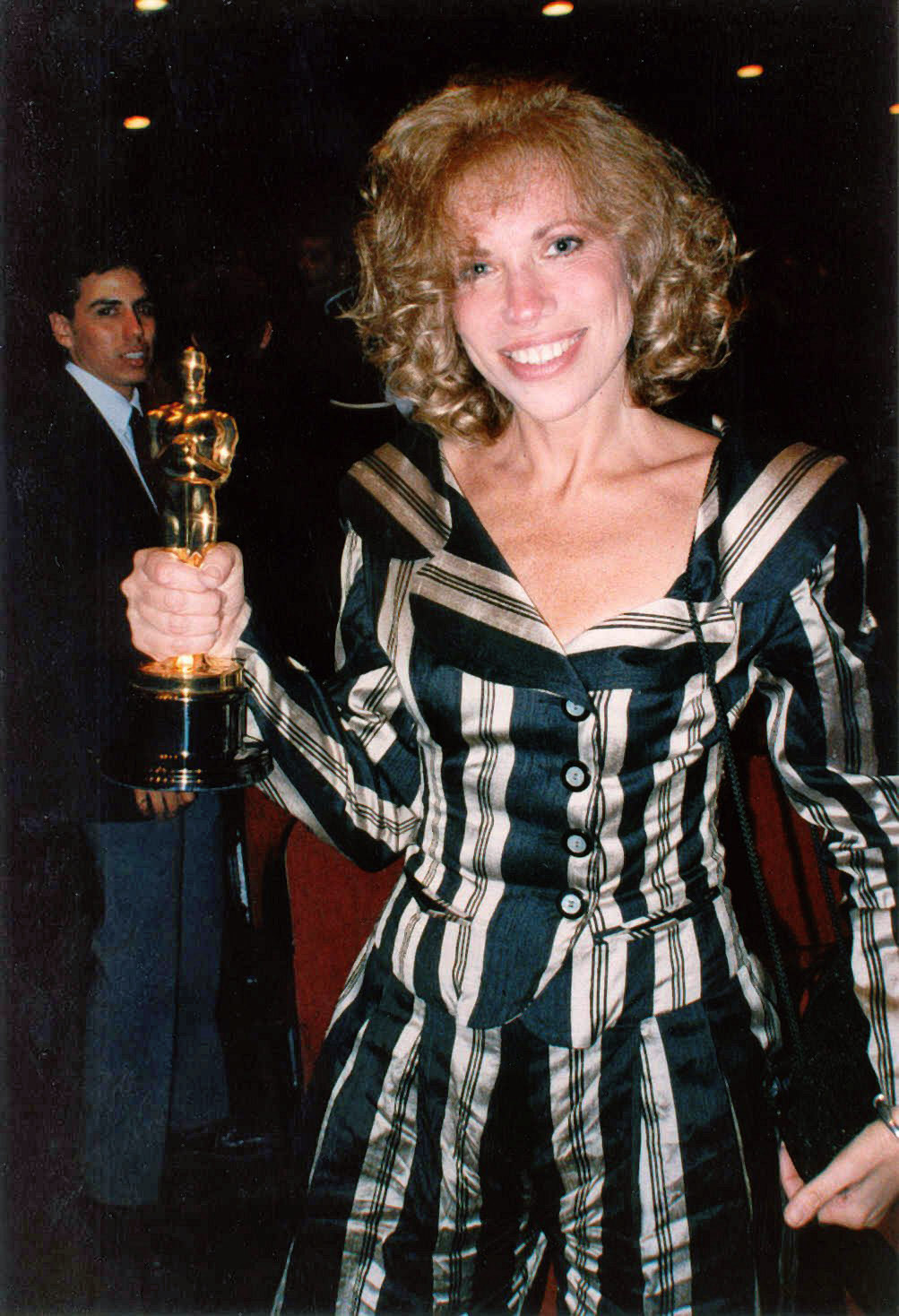
1990 award-winner Carly Simon.

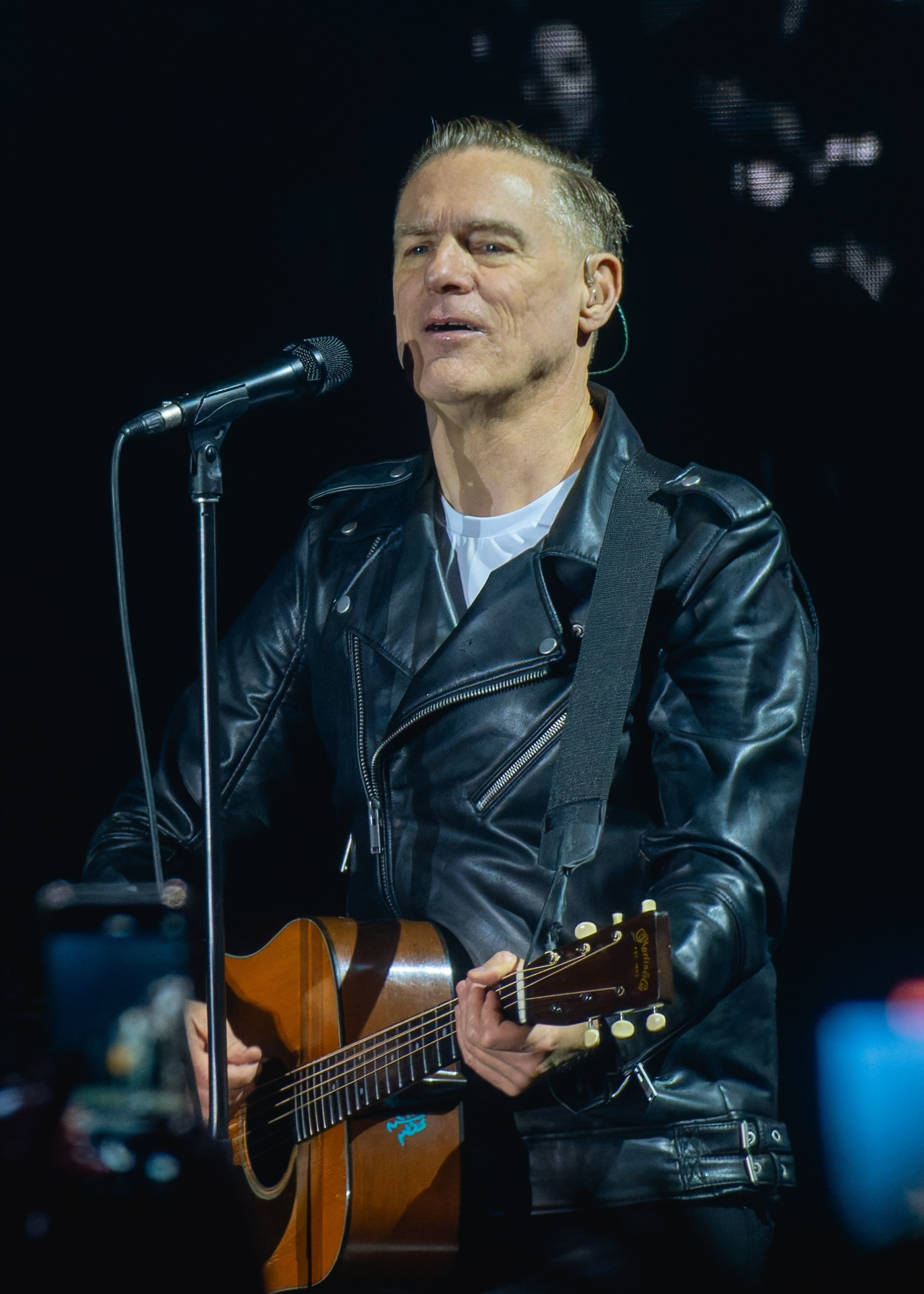
Bryan Adams won alongside Robert John "Mutt" Lange and Michael Kamen in 1992

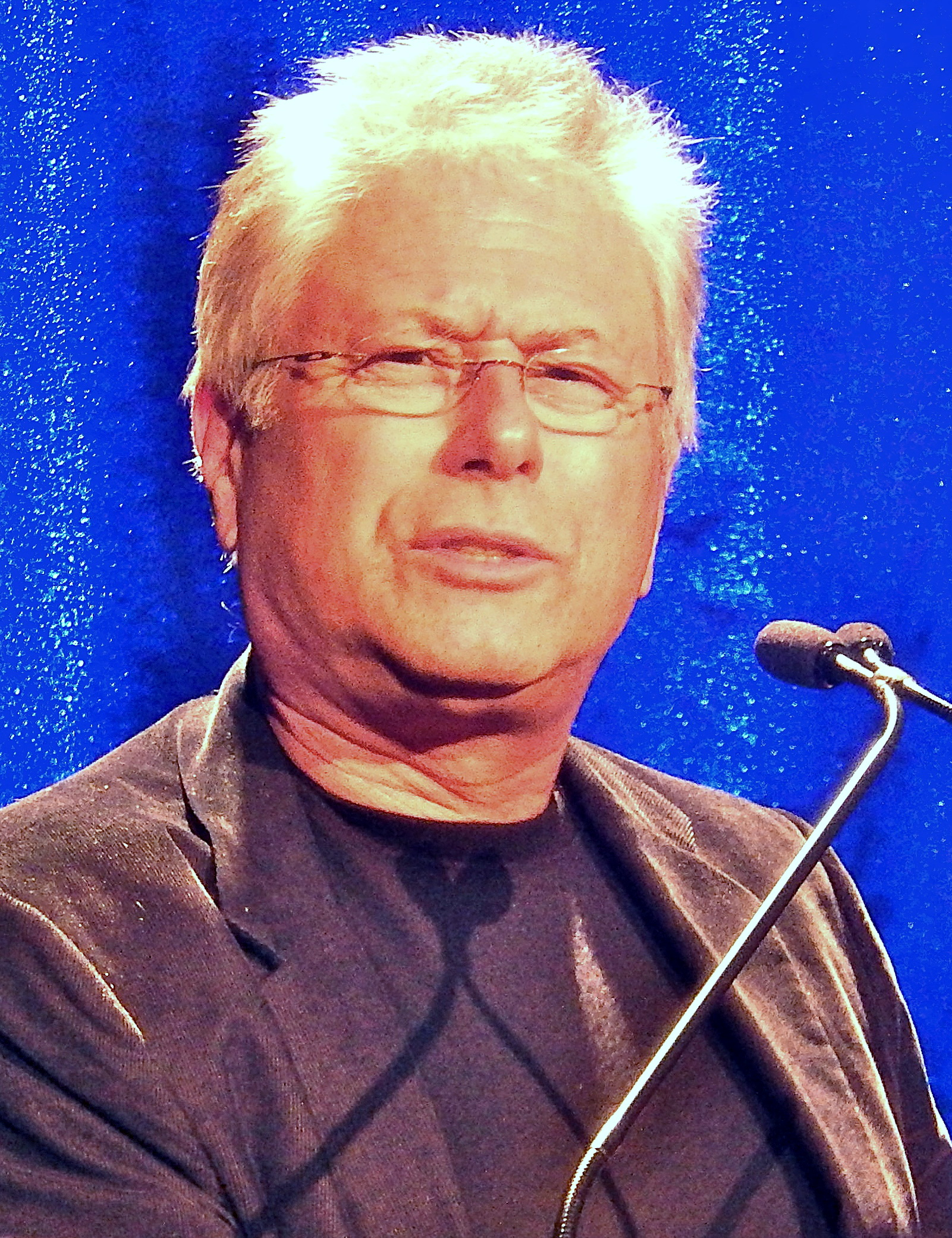
Five-time recipient Alan Menken was awarded for his work in numerous Disney films and is the first person to win this category for consecutive years, achieving the feat in 1993 and 1994.

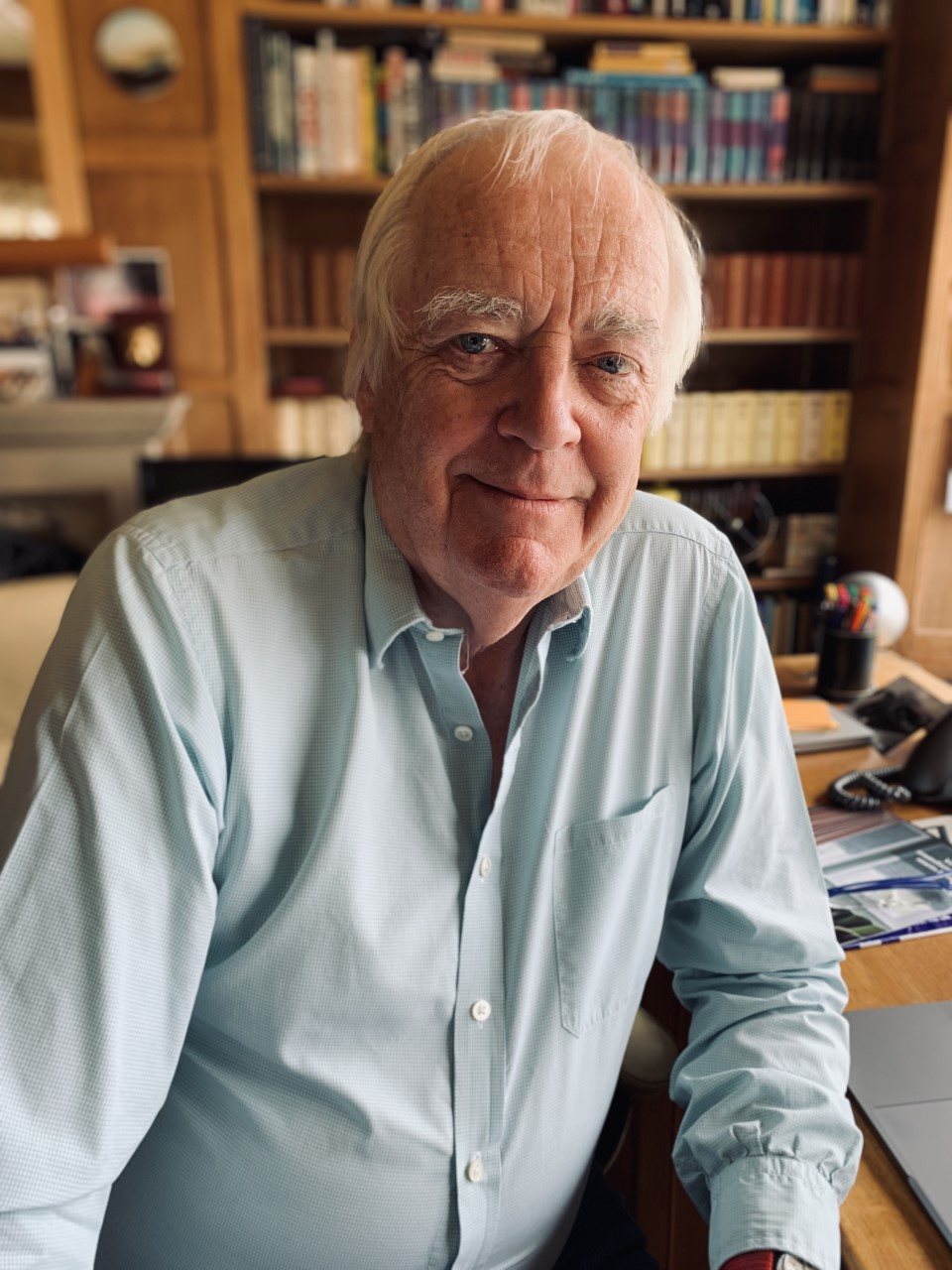
Tim Rice won alongside Alan Menken in 1994.

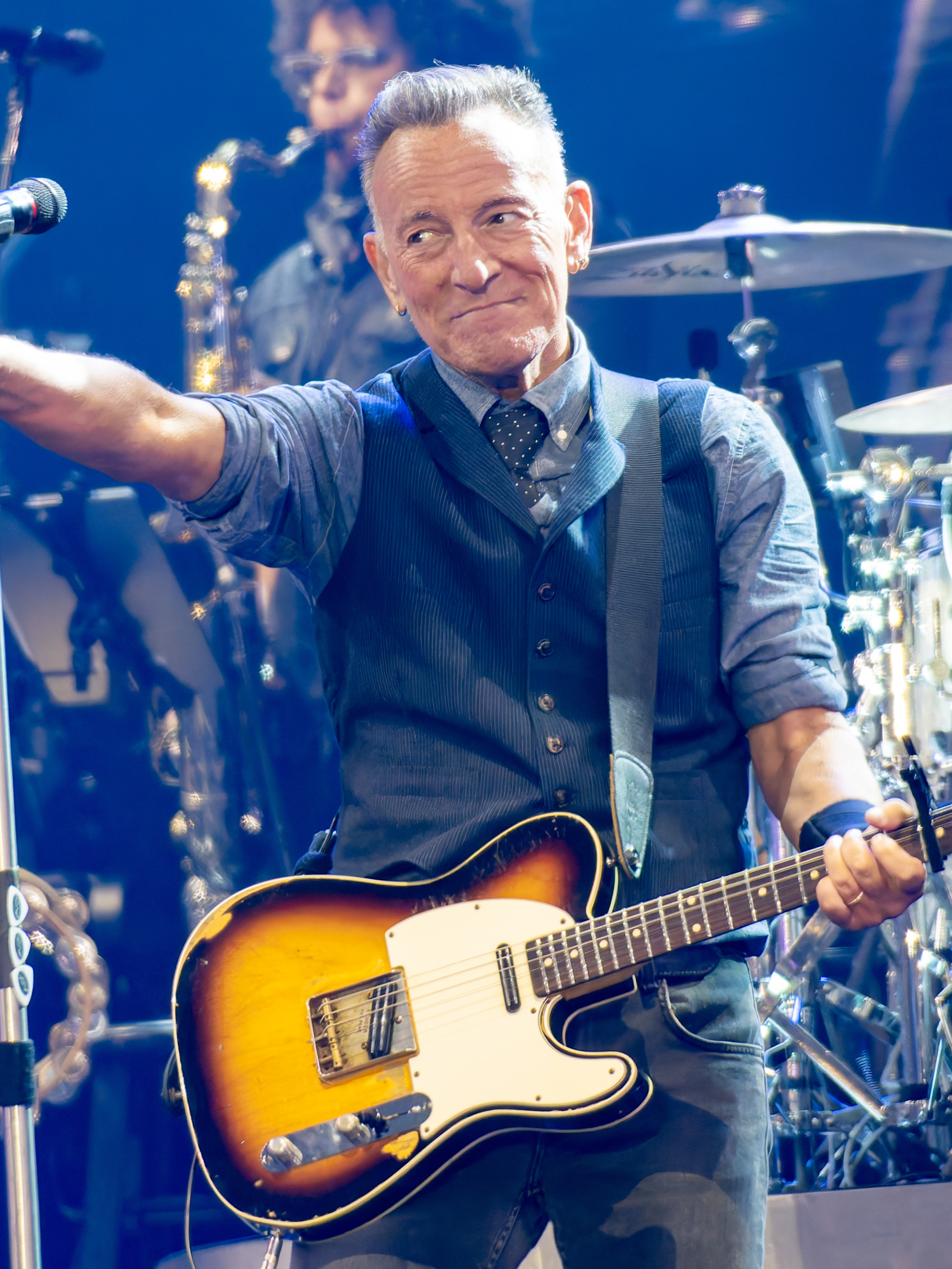
1995 award-winner Bruce Springsteen.

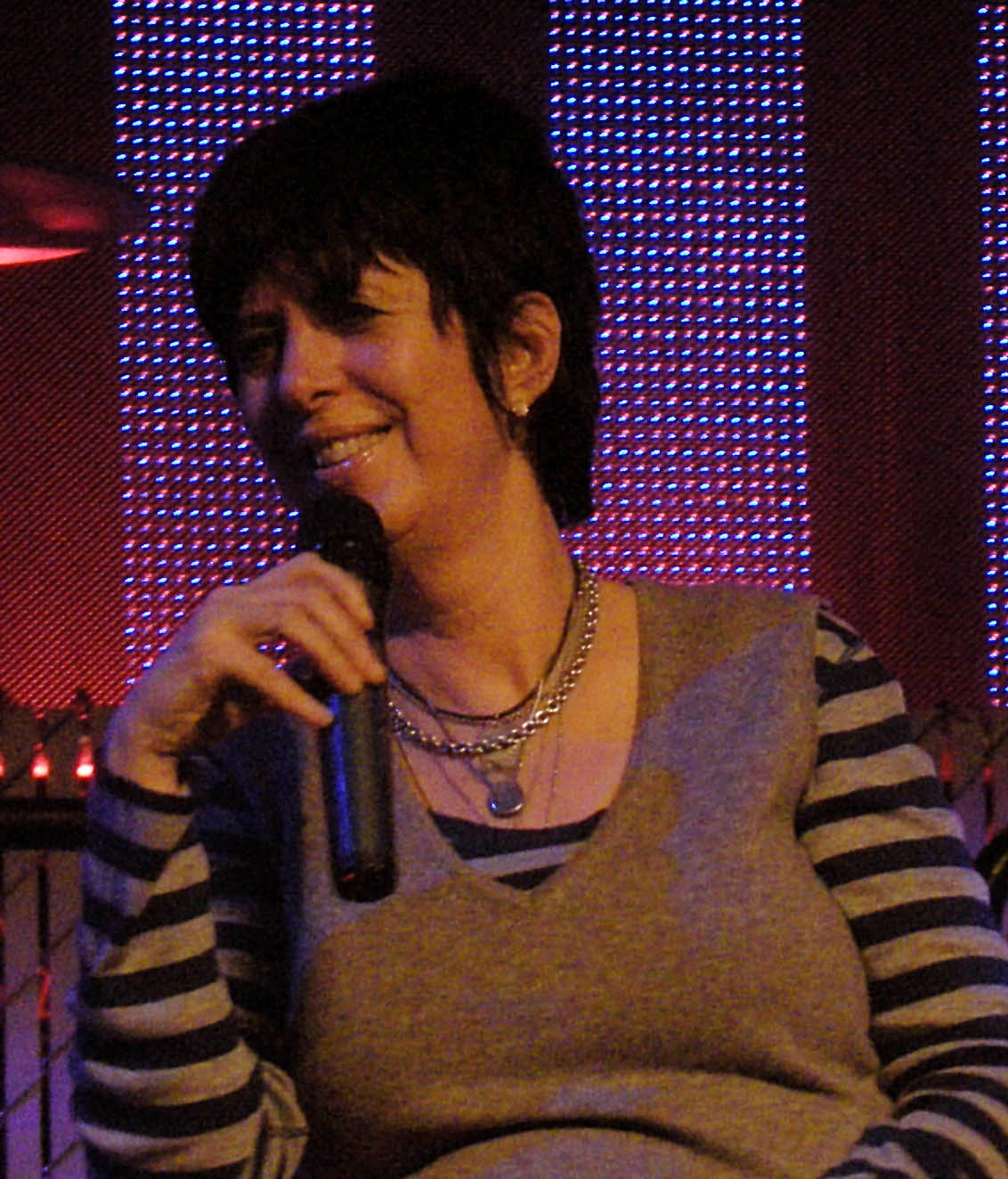
Eleven-time nominee and 1997 winner Diane Warren.

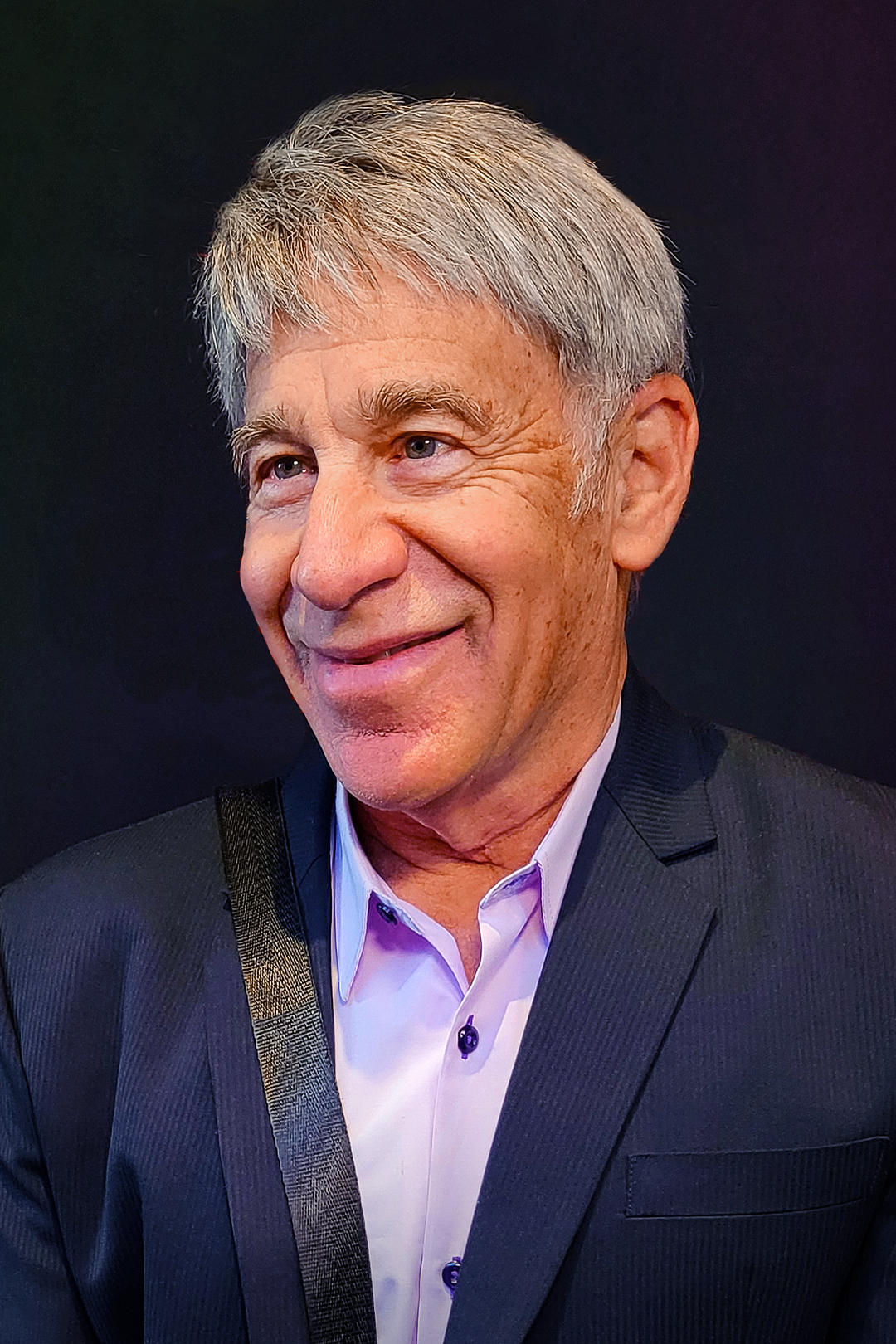
1996 winner and four-time nominee Stephen Schwartz.

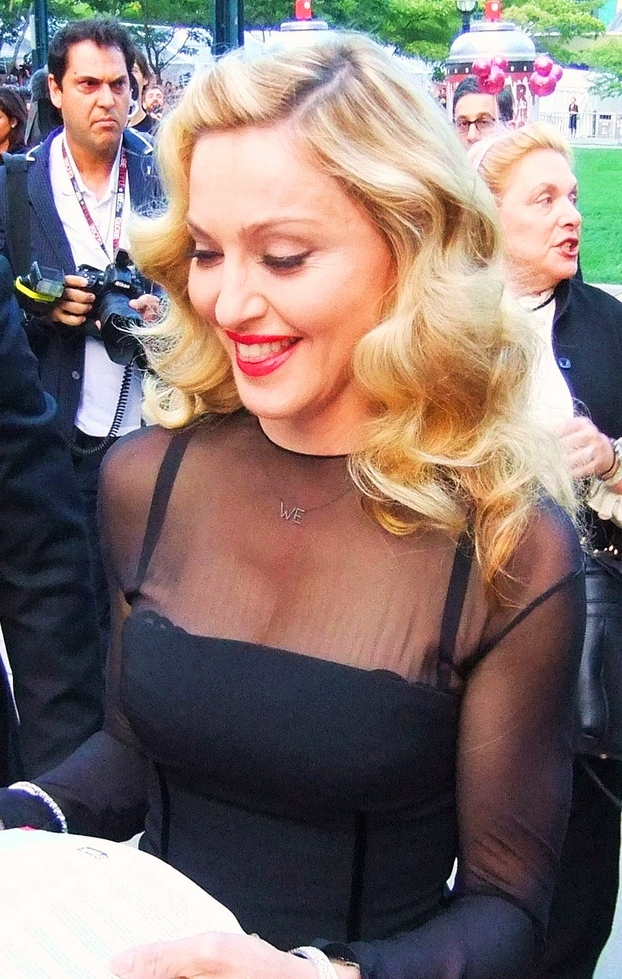
Madonna won in 2000 with William Orbit.

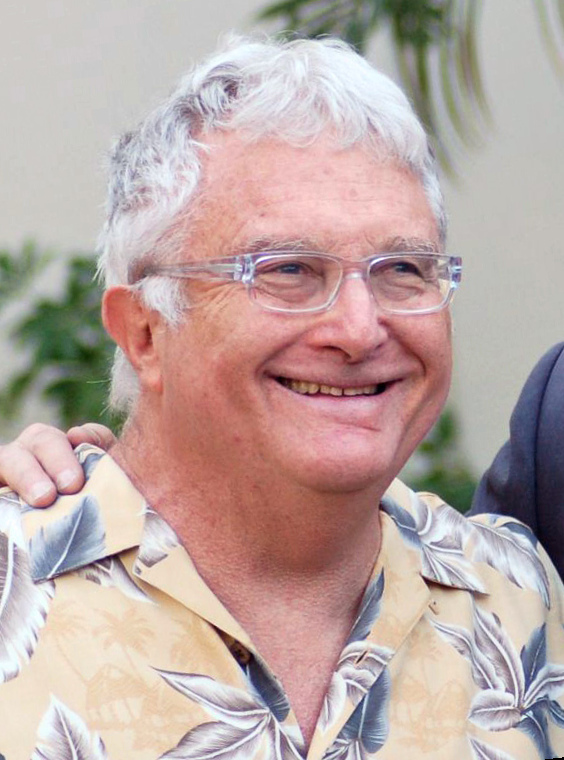
Three-time winner and seven-time nominee, Randy Newman.

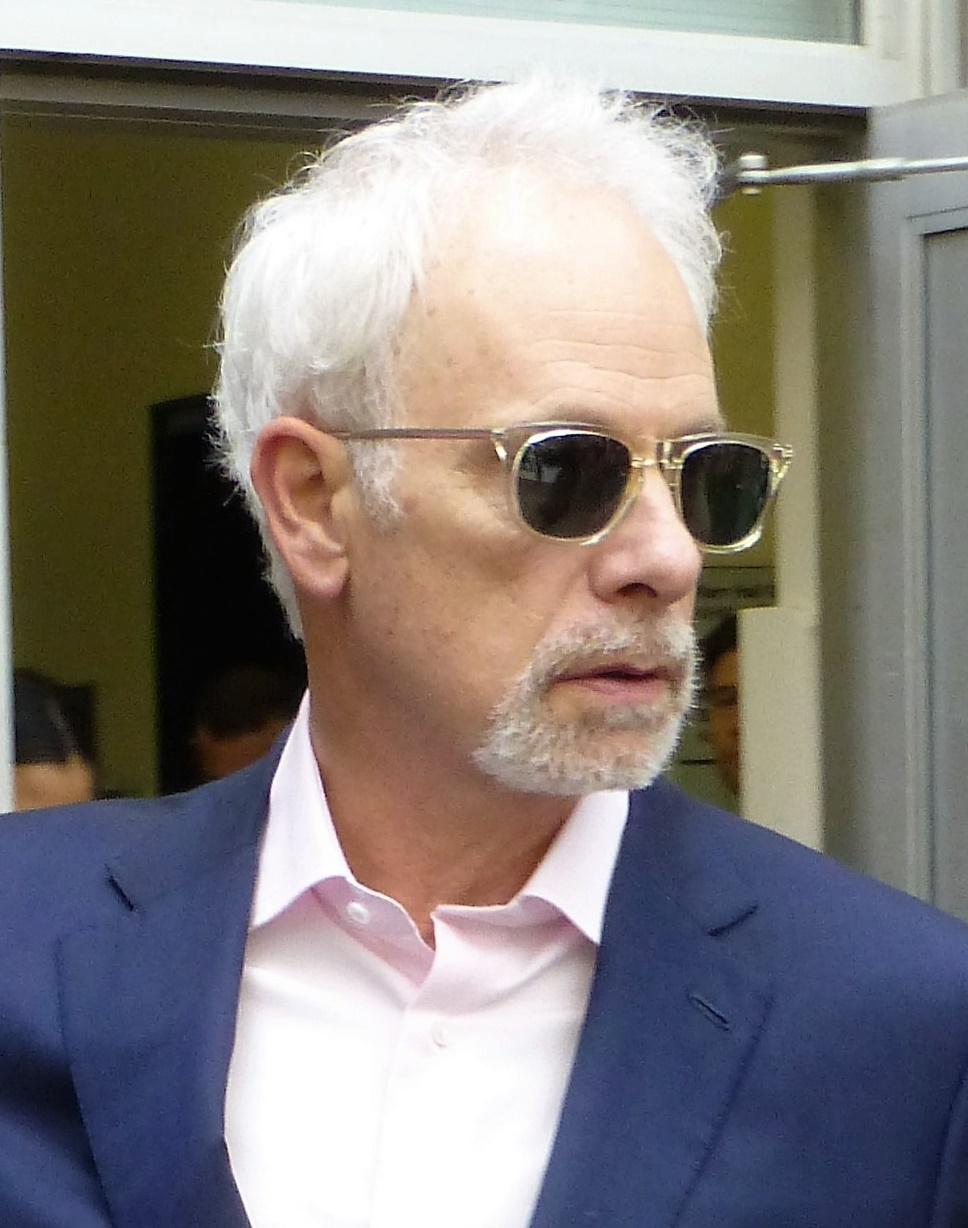
Christopher Guest won with Levy and McKean in 2004.

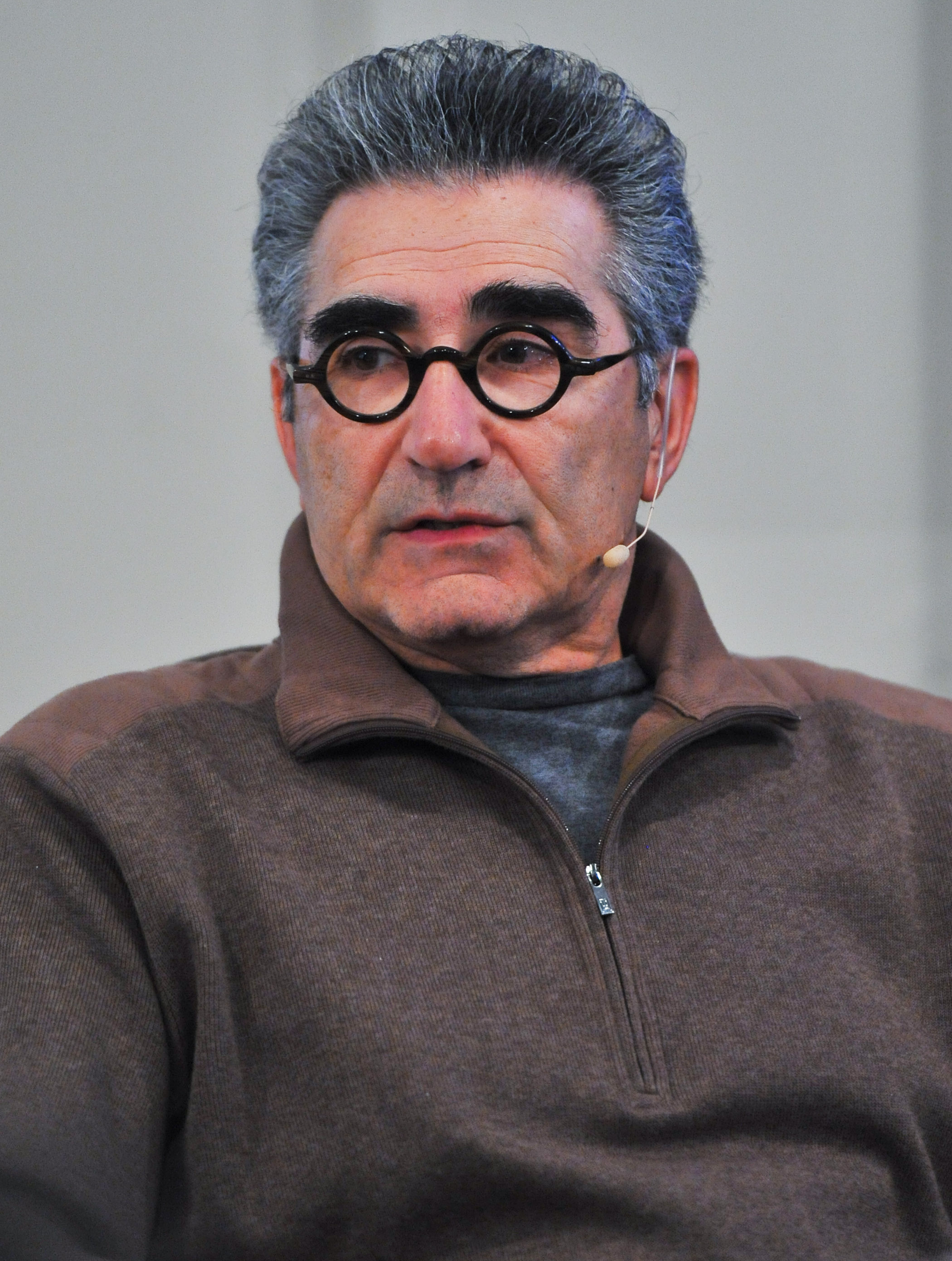
Eugene Levy won with Guest and McKean in 2004.

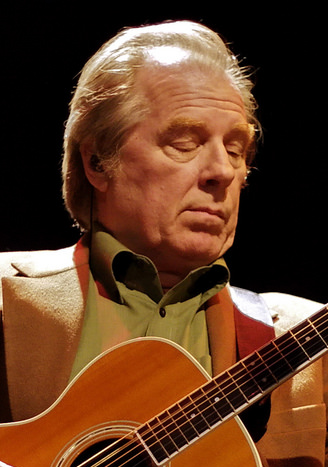
Michael McKean won with Guest and Levy in 2004.

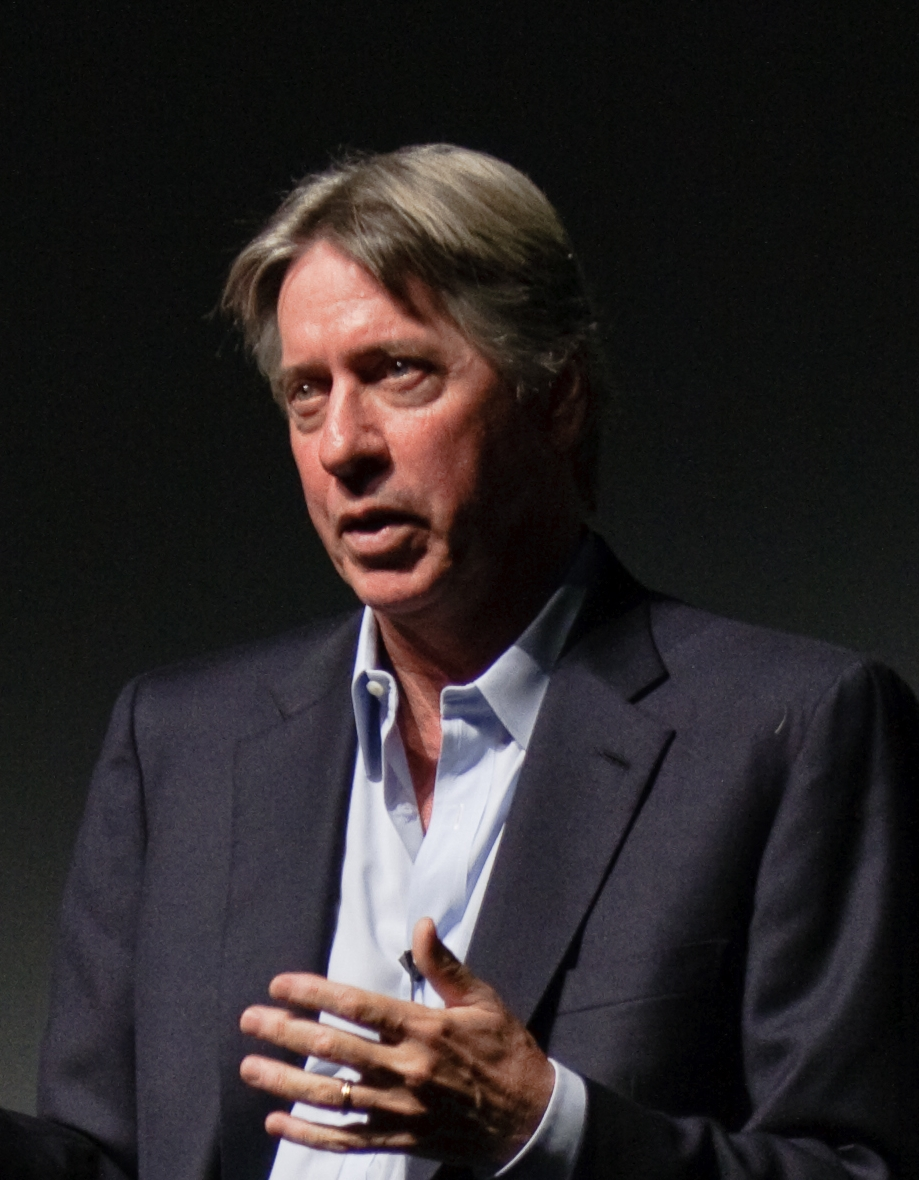
Alan Silvestri won in 2006.

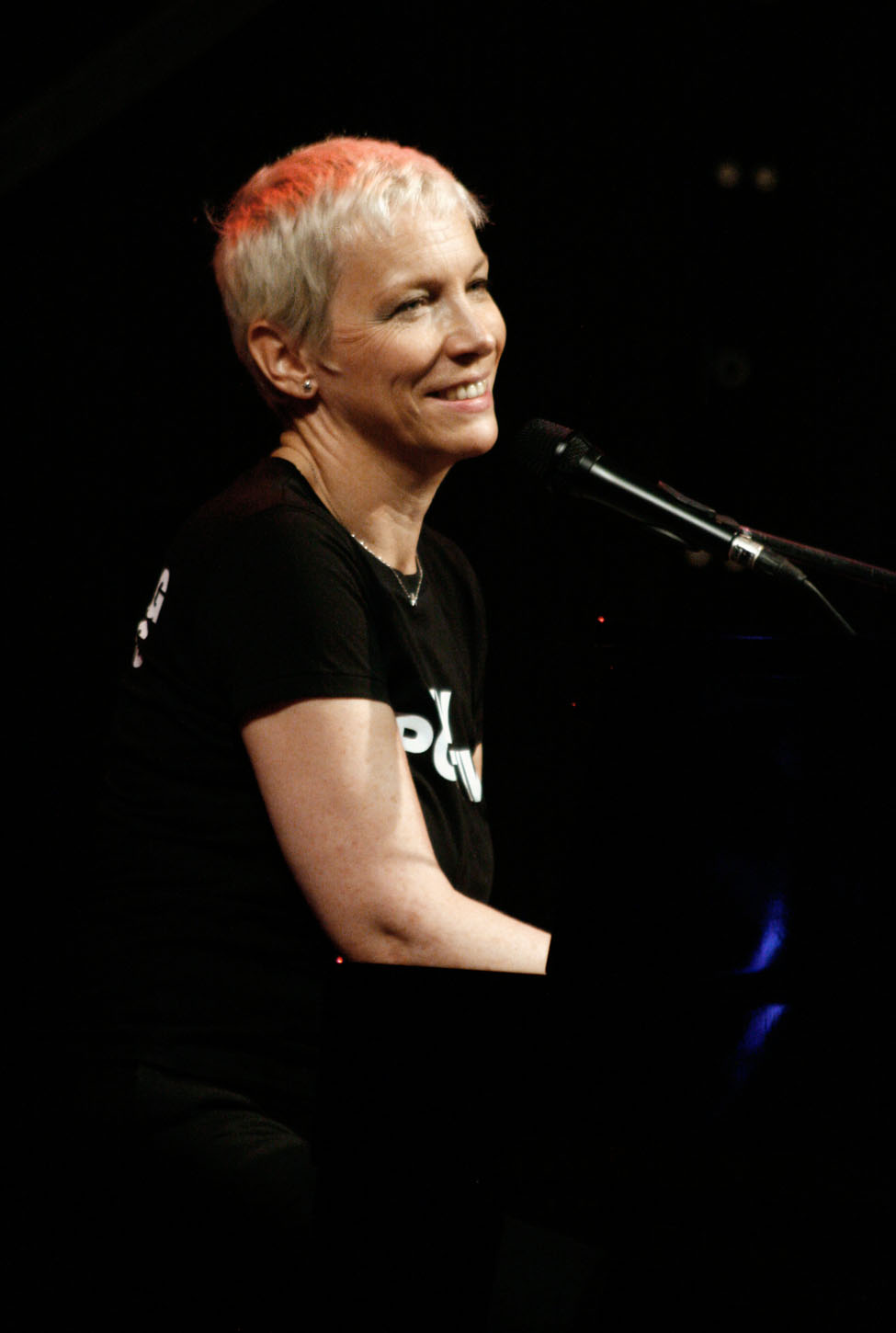
Annie Lennox won in 2005 alongside Howard Shore and Fran Walsh.

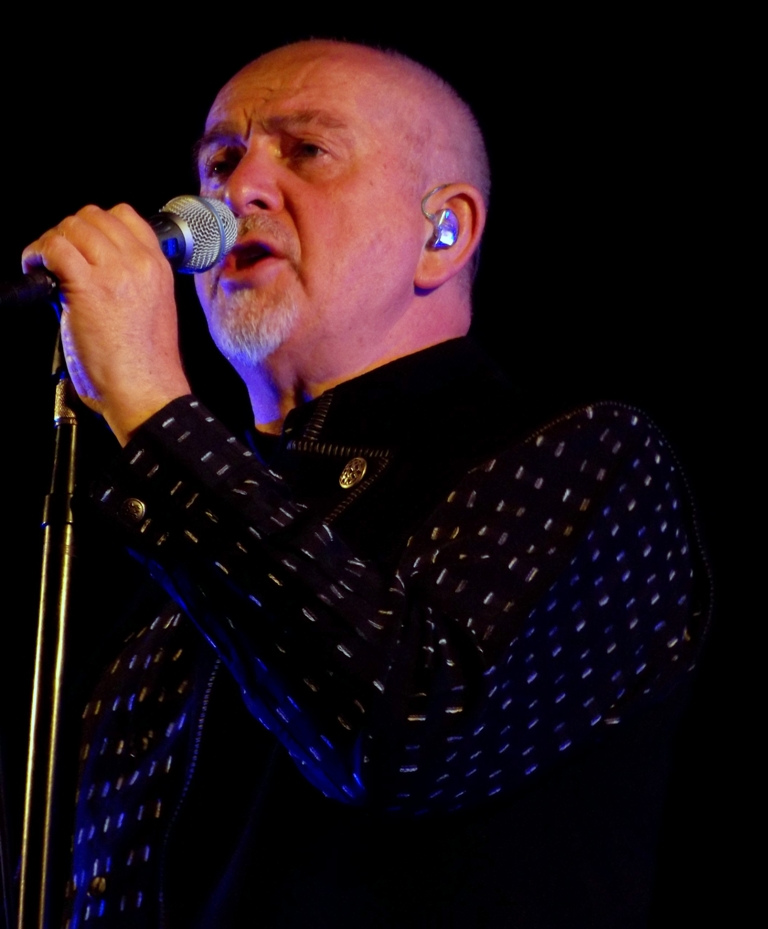
Peter Gabriel won with Newman in 2009.

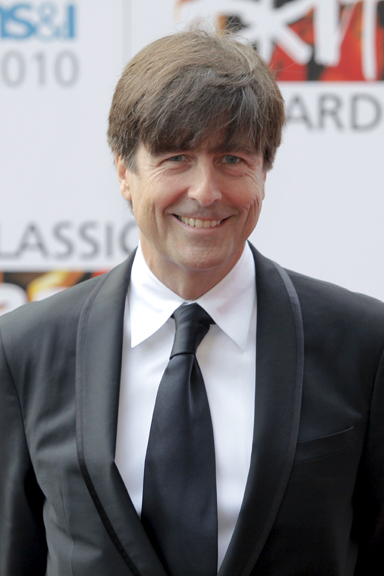
Thomas Newman won with Gabriel in 2009.

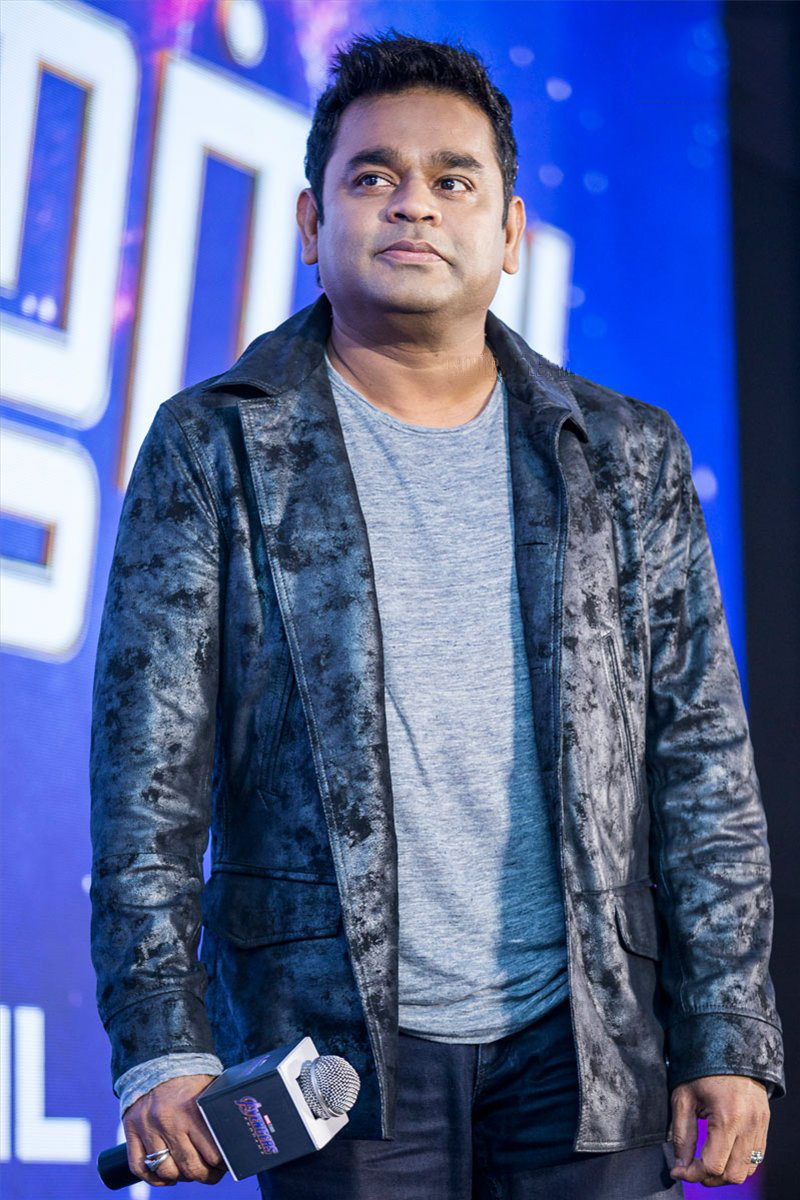
A. R. Rahman won in 2010 alongside Gulzar and Tanvi Shah.

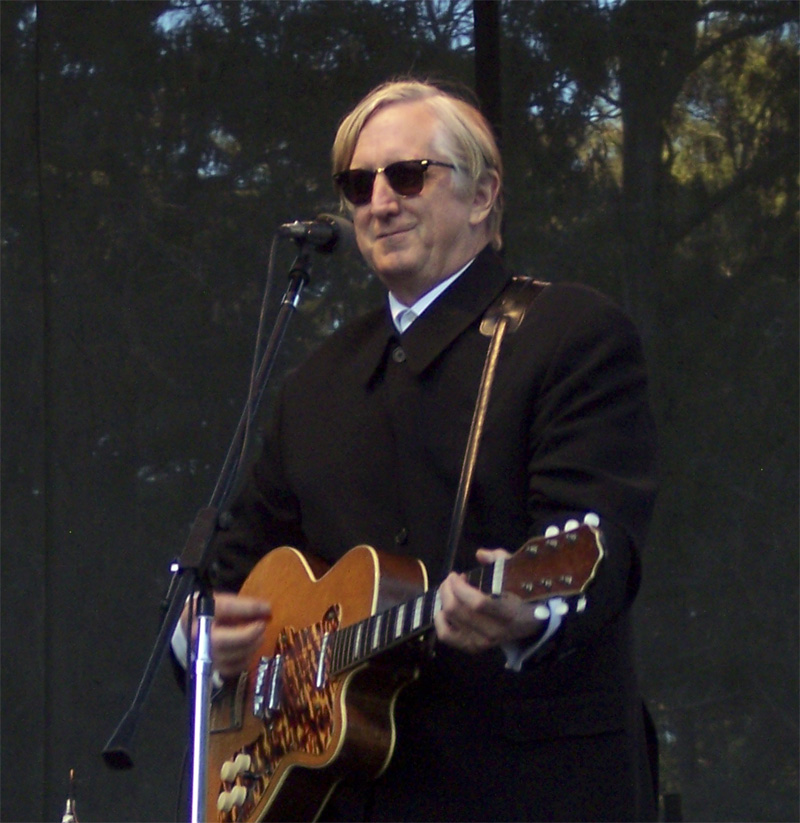
T Bone Burnett received the award for 2011 and 2013.

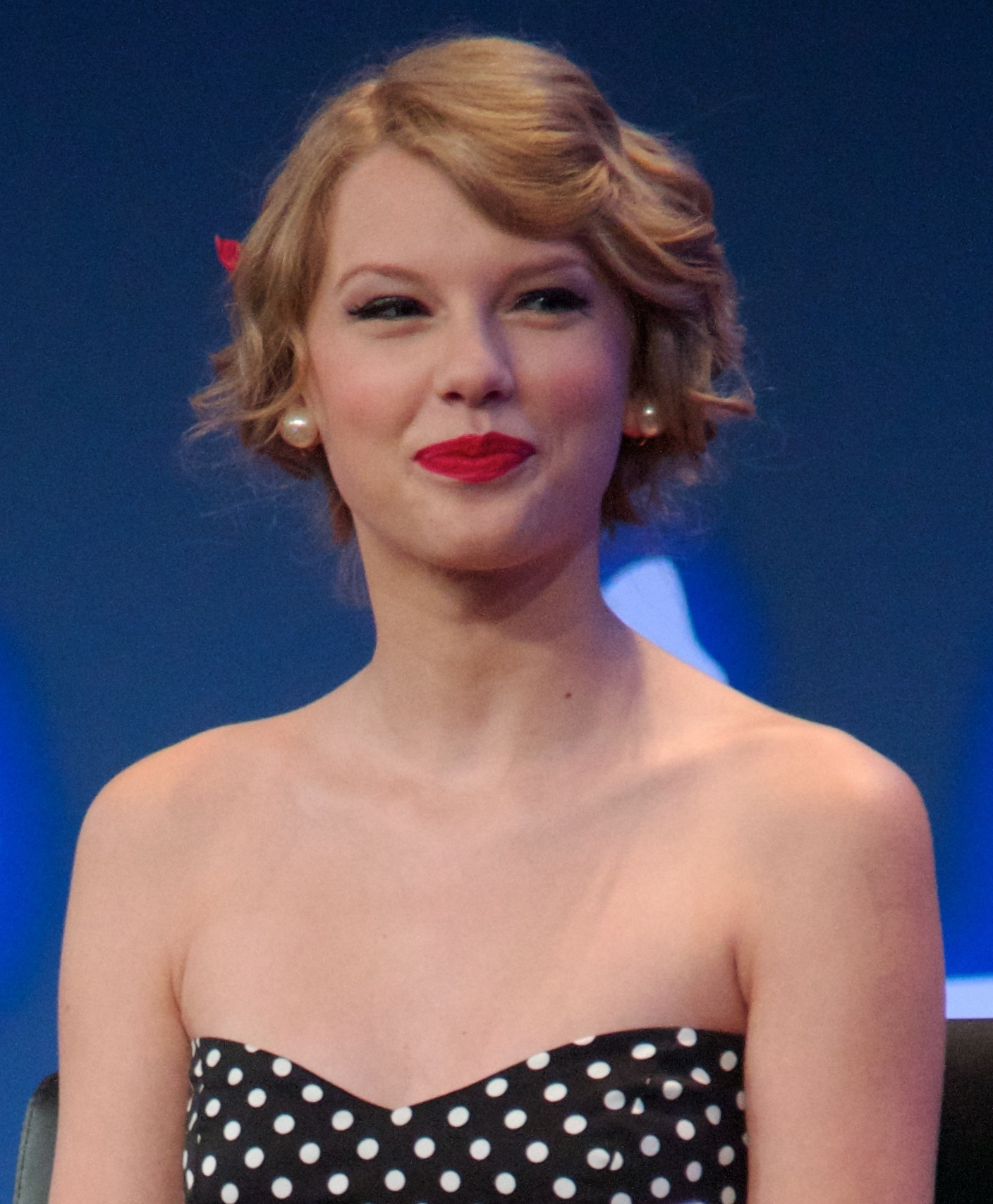
Taylor Swift won in 2013 alongside The Civil Wars and T Bone Burnett.

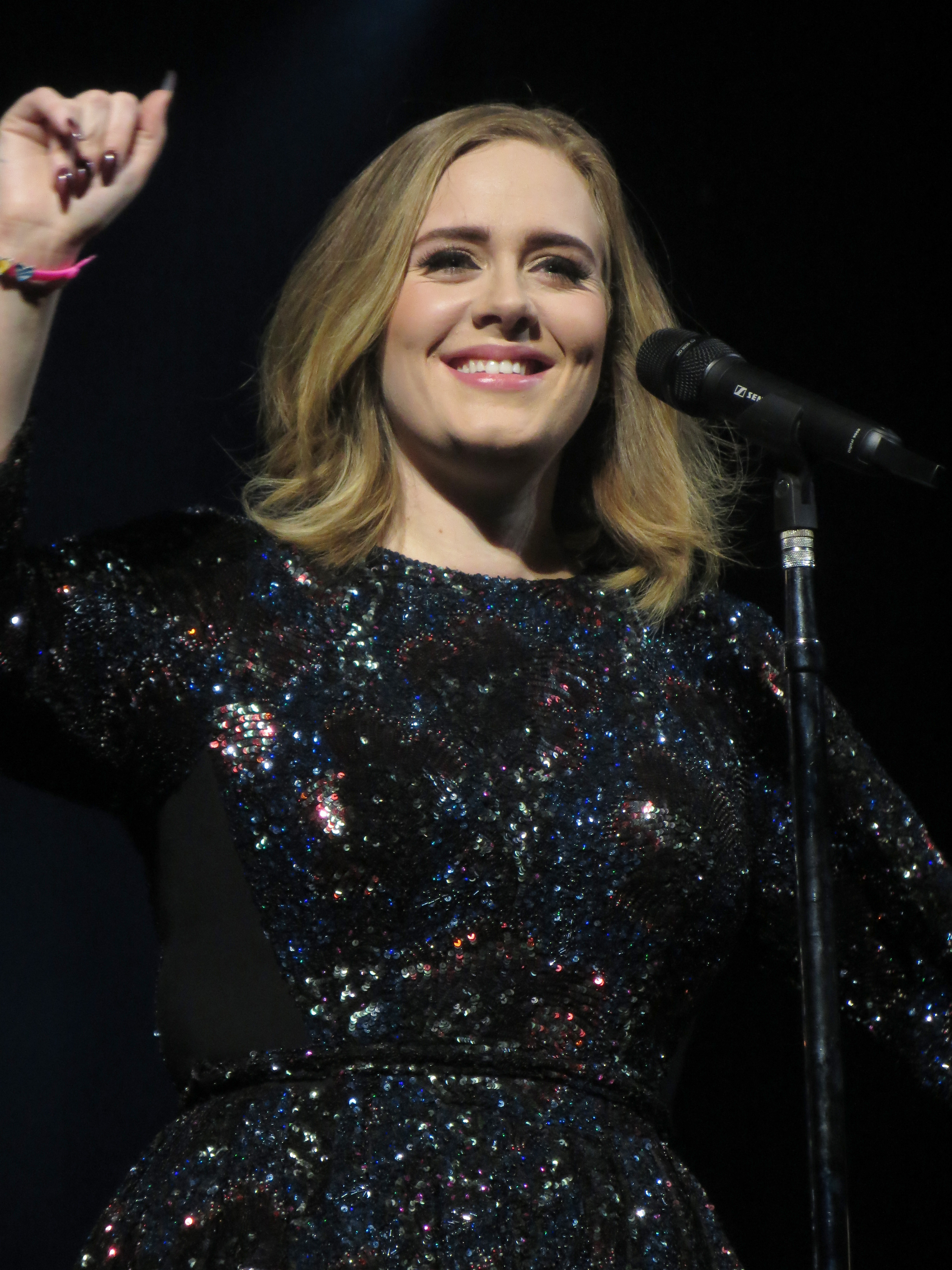
Adele won in 2014 with Paul Epworth.

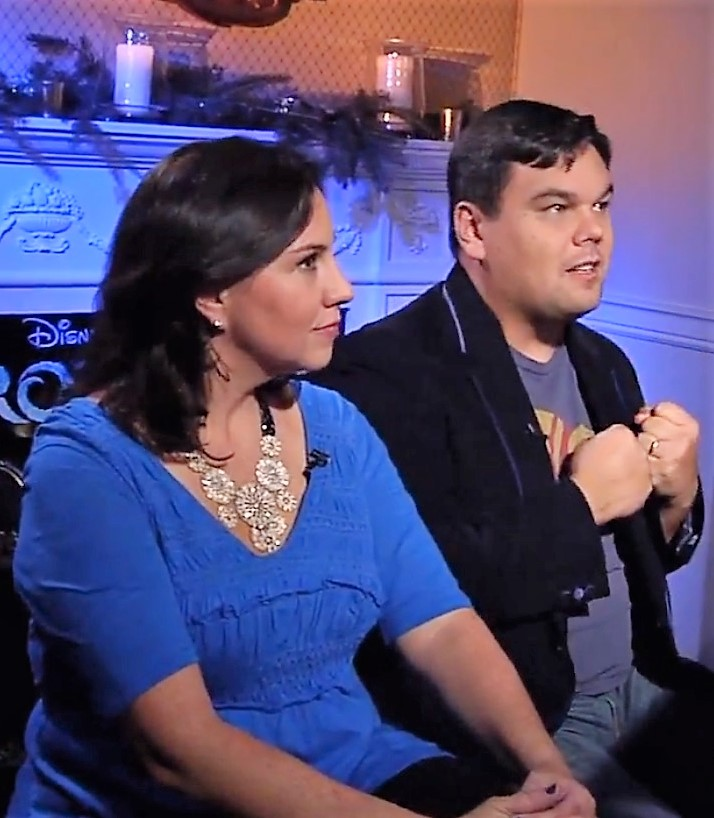
Husband and wife duo Robert Lopez and Kristen Anderson Lopez won the award in 2015 and were nominated in 2019, 2021 and 2022.

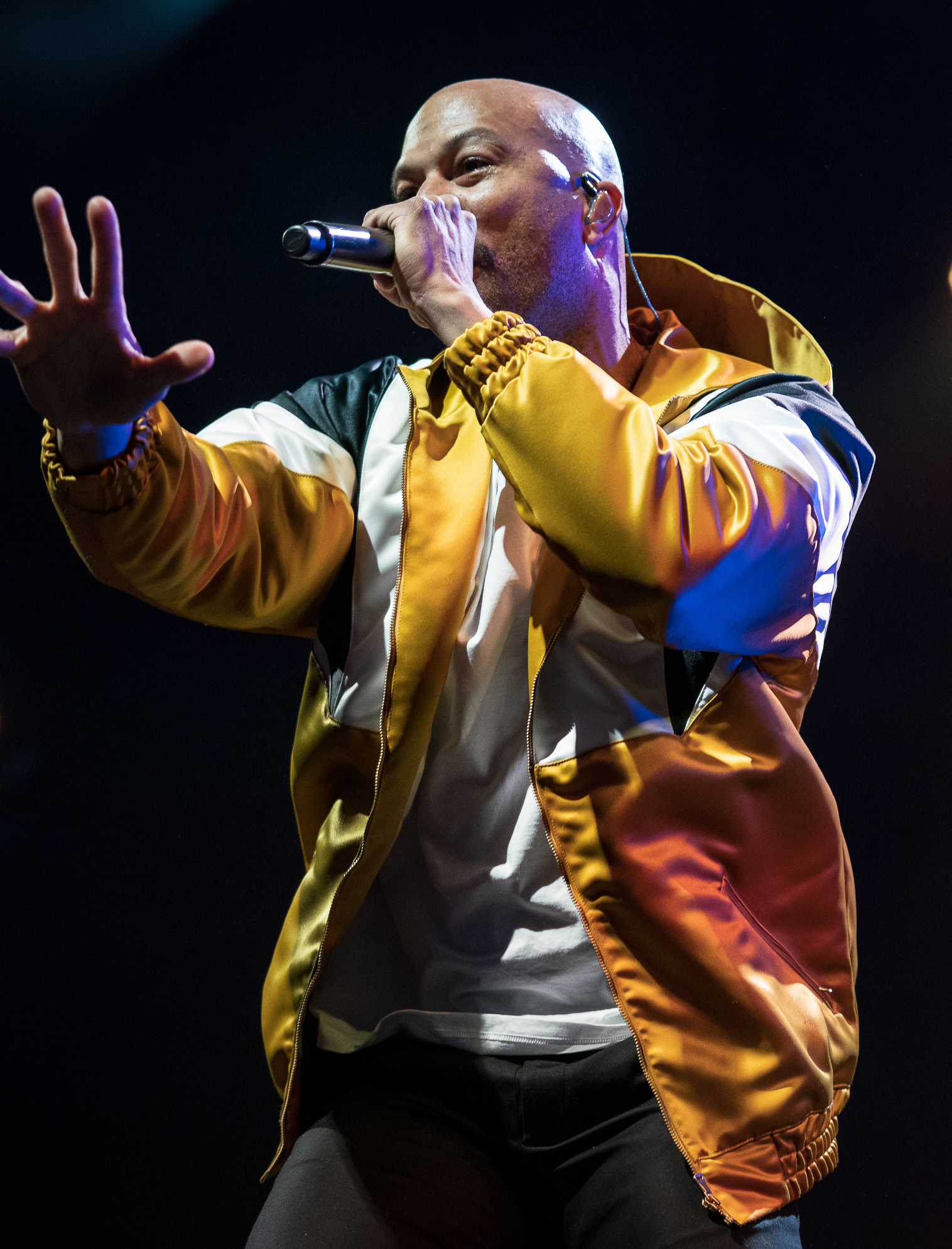
Common won in 2016 with Rhymefest & John Legend.

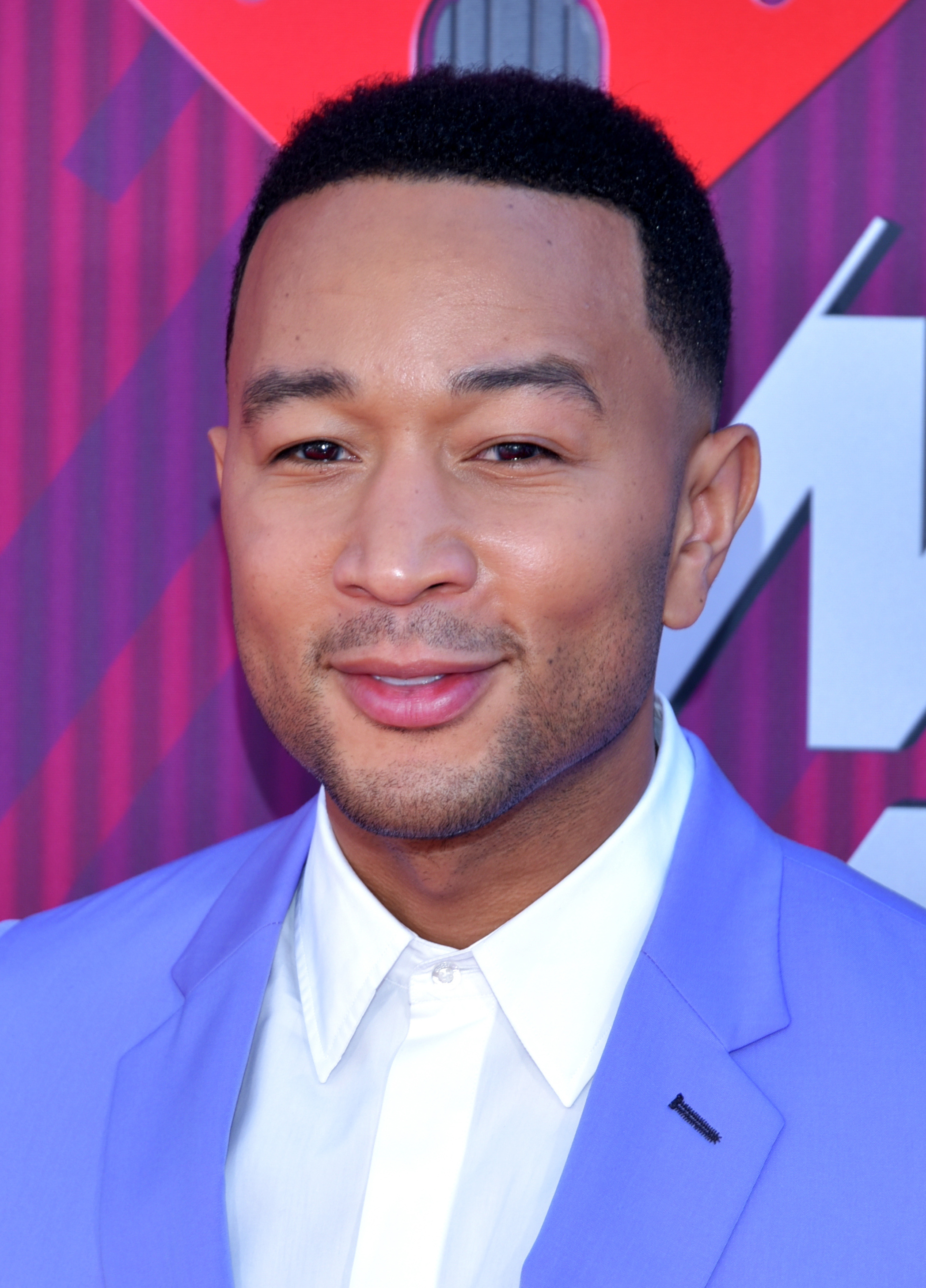
John Legend won with Common in 2016.

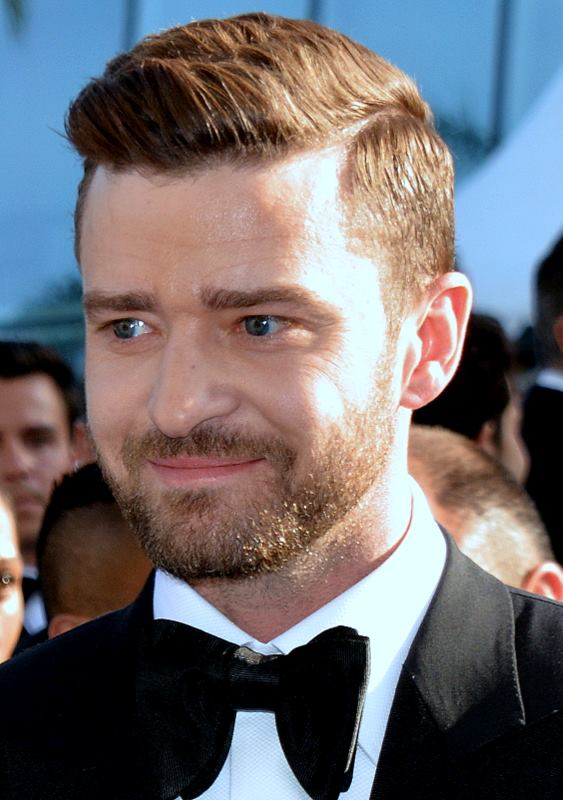
Justin Timberlake won alongside Max Martin and Shellback in 2017.

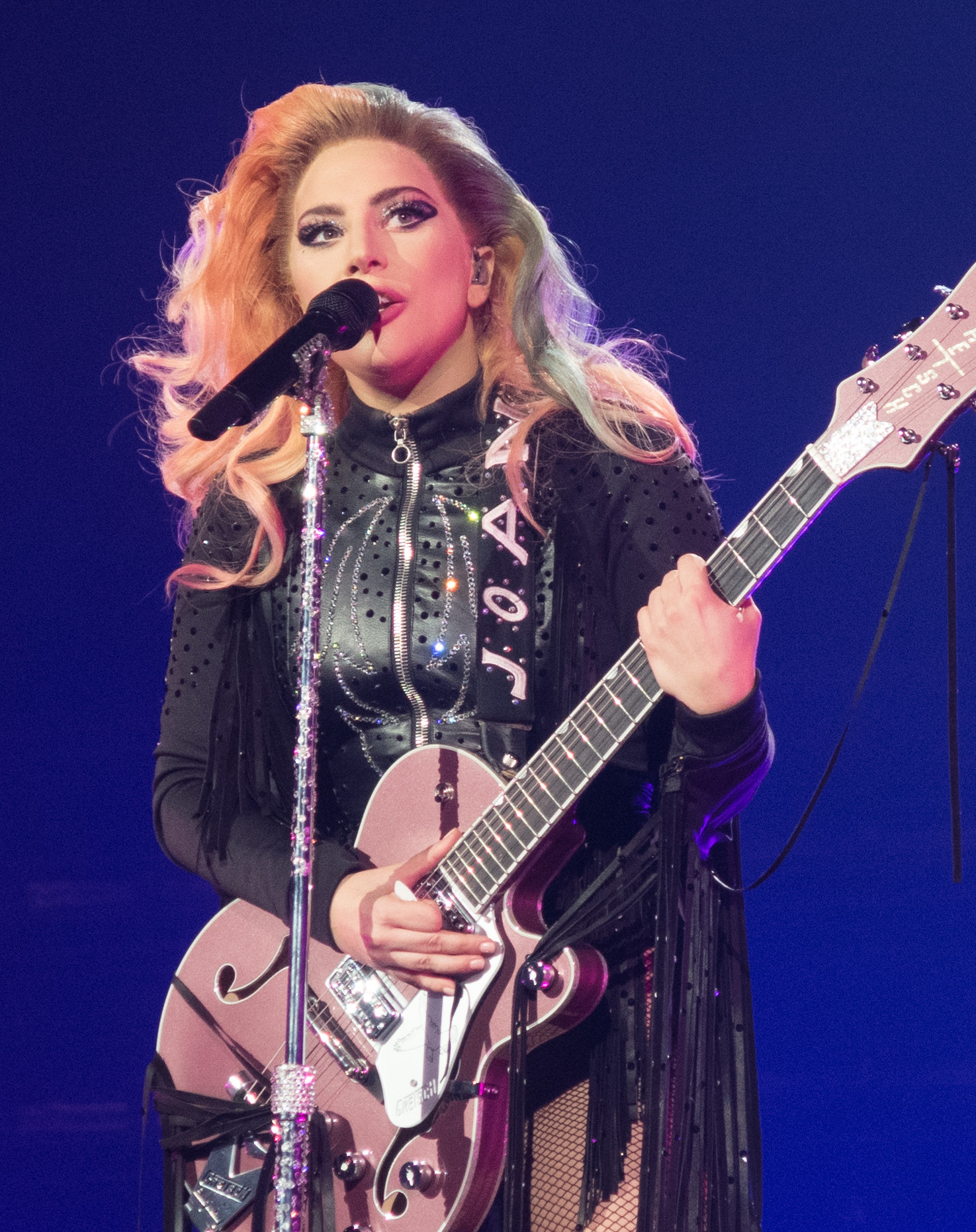
Lady Gaga won the award in consecutive years (2019 and 2020)

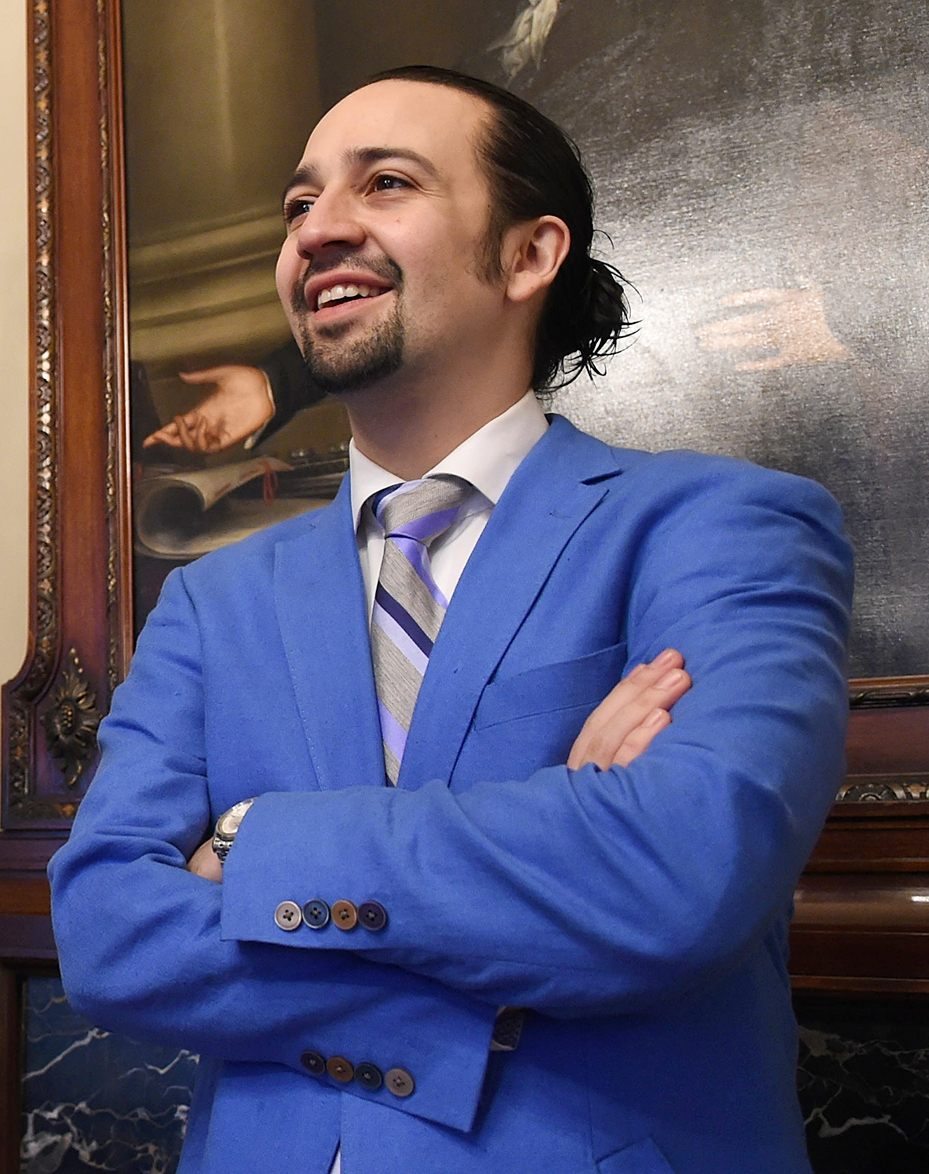
Lin-Manuel Miranda won in 2018 and 2023.

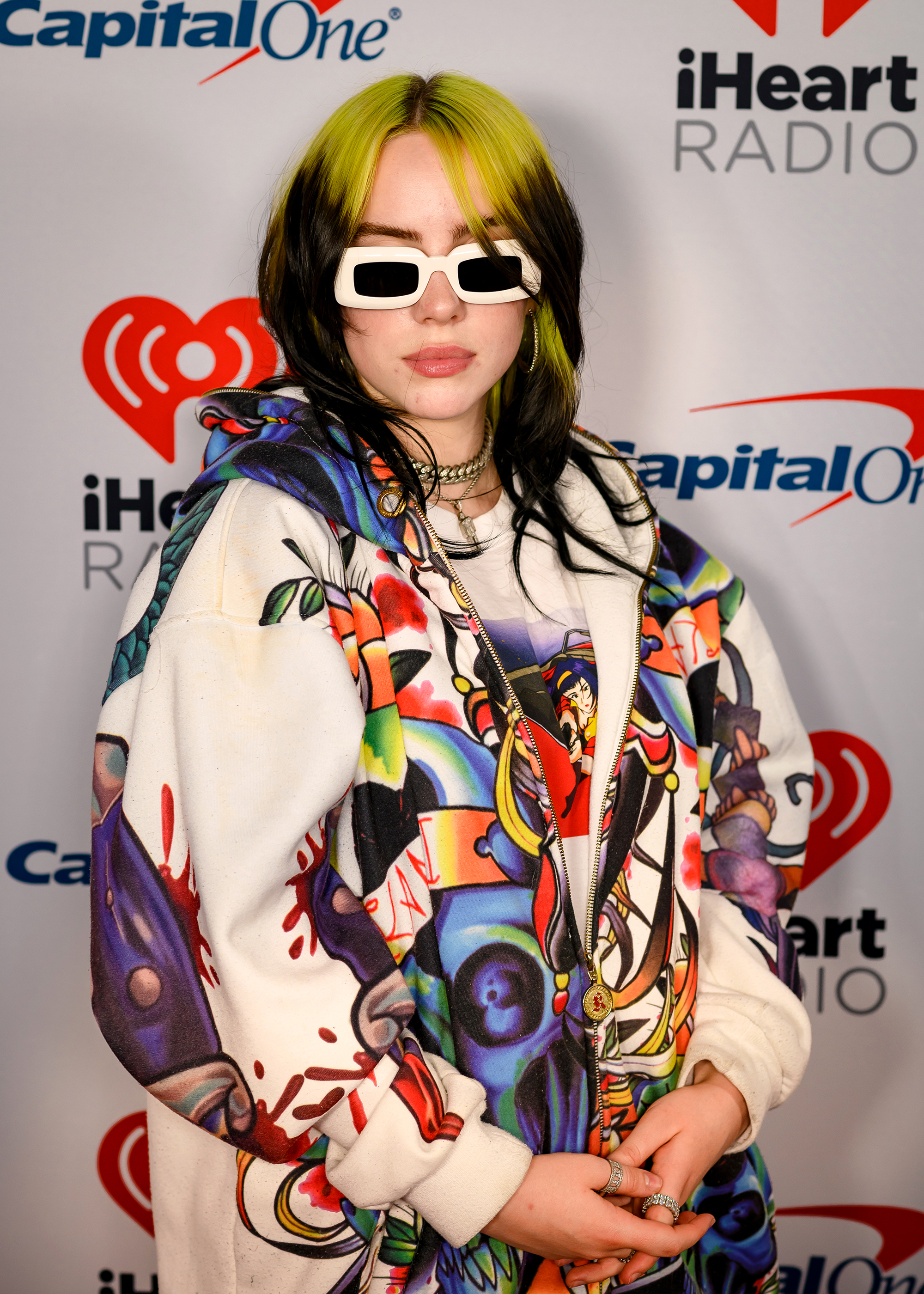
Billie Eilish won in 2021 and 2024 alongside her brother, Finneas O'Connell, and is the youngest person to win this category.

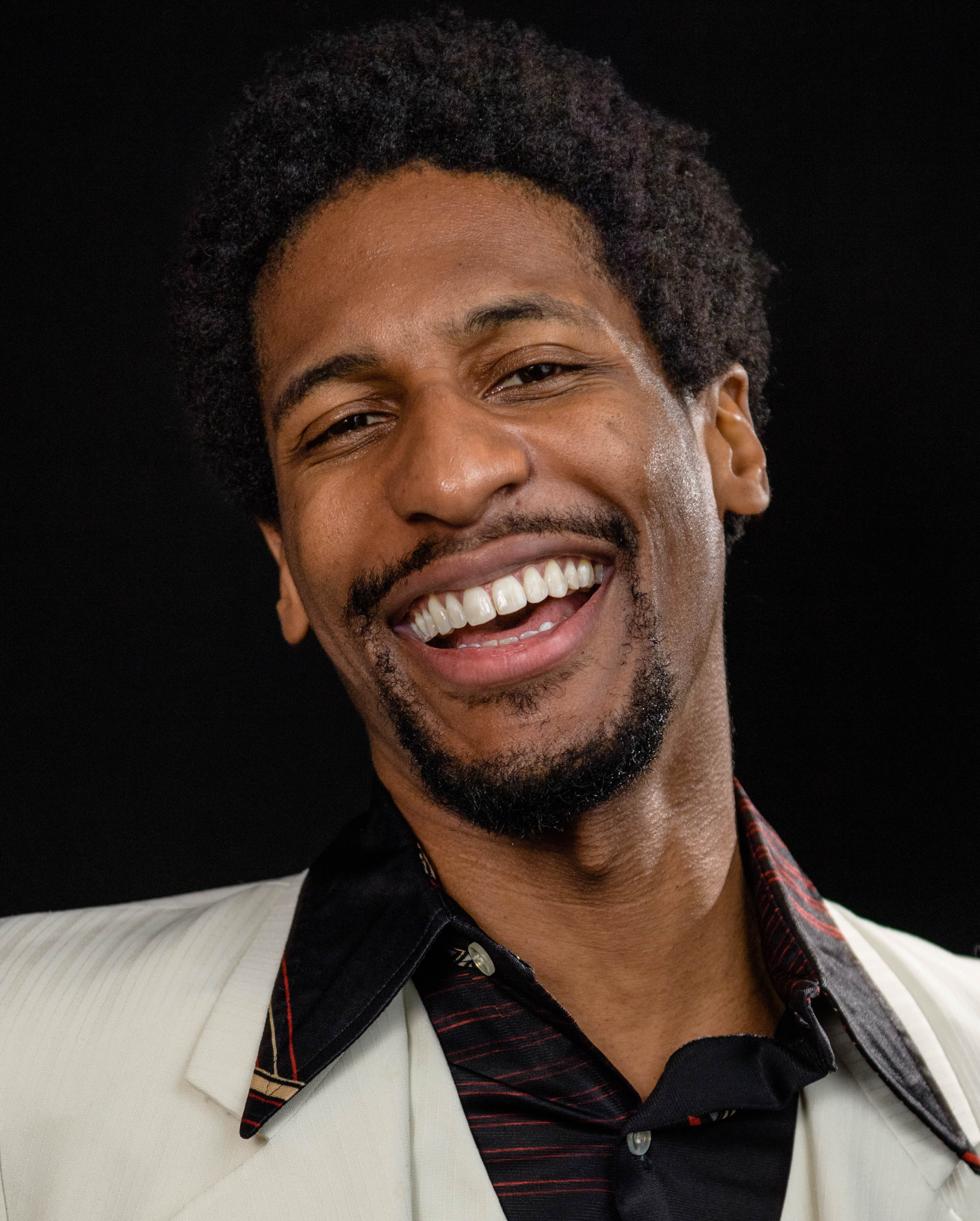
Jon Batiste won with Dan Wilson in 2025.

=== 1980s ===
Year^{[I]}	Song	Nominee(s)	Performer(s)^{[II]}	Work
1988
1988	"Somewhere Out There"	James Horner, Barry Mann & Cynthia Weil	Linda Ronstadt & James Ingram	An American Tail
1988	"(I've Had) The Time of My Life"	Franke Previte, John DeNicola & Donald Markowitz	Bill Medley and Jennifer Warnes	Dirty Dancing
1988	"Moonlighting"	Al Jarreau & Lee Holdridge	Al Jarreau	Moonlighting
1988	"Nothing's Gonna Stop Us Now"	Diane Warren & Albert Hammond	Starship	Mannequin
1988	"Who's That Girl"	Patrick Leonard & Madonna	Madonna	Who's That Girl
1989
1989	"Two Hearts"	Phil Collins & Lamont Dozier	Phil Collins	Buster
1989	"Century's End"	Donald Fagen	Donald Fagen	Bright Lights, Big City
1989	"Cry Freedom"	George Fenton & Jonas Gwangwa	George Fenton & Jonas Gwangwa	Cry Freedom
1989	"Kokomo"	Mike Love, Terry Melcher, John Phillips & Scott McKenzie	The Beach Boys	Cocktail
1989	"One Moment in Time"	Albert Hammond & John Bettis	Whitney Houston	1988 Summer Olympics

=== 1990s ===
Year^{[I]}	Song	Nominee(s)	Performer(s)^{[II]}	Work
1990
1990	"Let the River Run"	Carly Simon	Carly Simon	Working Girl
1990	"Angel of Harlem"	U2	U2	U2: Rattle and Hum
1990	"The Girl Who Used to Be Me"	Alan & Marilyn Bergman & Marvin Hamlisch	Patti Austin	Shirley Valentine
1990	"I Love to See You Smile"	Randy Newman	Randy Newman	Parenthood
1990	"Partyman"	Prince	Prince	Batman
1991
1991	"Under the Sea"	Alan Menken & Howard Ashman	Various artists	The Little Mermaid
1991	"Blaze of Glory"	Jon Bon Jovi	Jon Bon Jovi	Young Guns II
1991	"Kiss the Girl"	Howard Ashman & Alan Menken	Various artists	The Little Mermaid
1991	"More"	Stephen Sondheim	Madonna	Dick Tracy
1991	"Sooner or Later"	Stephen Sondheim	Madonna	Dick Tracy
1992
1992	"(Everything I Do) I Do It for You"	Robert John "Mutt" Lange, Michael Kamen & Bryan Adams	Bryan Adams	Robin Hood: Prince of Thieves
1992	"Gotta Have You"	Stevie Wonder	Stevie Wonder	Jungle Fever
1992	"Jungle Fever"	Stevie Wonder	Stevie Wonder	Jungle Fever
1992	"Somewhere in My Memory"	John Williams & Leslie Bricusse	John Williams	Home Alone
1993
1993	"Beauty and the Beast"	Howard Ashman (posthumous) & Alan Menken	Celine Dion & Peabo Bryson	Beauty and the Beast
1993	"Beautiful Maria of My Soul"	Robert Kraft & Arne Glimcher	Los Lobos	The Mambo Kings
1993	"It's Probably Me"	Michael Kamen, Sting & Eric Clapton	Sting with Eric Clapton	Lethal Weapon 3
1993	"Now and Forever"	Carole King	Carole King	A League of Their Own
1993	"Tears in Heaven"	Eric Clapton & Will Jennings	Eric Clapton	Rush
1994
1994	"A Whole New World"	Alan Menken & Tim Rice	Peabo Bryson & Regina Belle	Aladdin
1994	"Friend Like Me"	Alan Menken & Howard Ashman (posthumous)	Robin Williams	Aladdin
1994	"I Don't Wanna Fight"	Steve DuBerry, Lulu Lawrie & Billy Lawrie	Tina Turner	What's Love Got to Do with It
1994	"I Have Nothing"	David Foster & Linda Thompson	Whitney Houston	The Bodyguard
1994	"Run to You"	Allan Dennis Rich & Jud Friedman	Whitney Houston	The Bodyguard
1995
1995	"Streets of Philadelphia"	Bruce Springsteen	Bruce Springsteen	Philadelphia
1995	"Can You Feel the Love Tonight?"	Elton John & Tim Rice	Elton John	The Lion King
1995	"Circle of Life"	Elton John & Tim Rice	Elton John	The Lion King
1995	"The Day I Fall in Love"	Carole Bayer Sager, Clif Magness & James Ingram	Dolly Parton and James Ingram	Beethoven's 2nd
1995	"I'll Remember"	Madonna, Patrick Leonard & Richard Page	Madonna	With Honors
1996
1996	"Colors of the Wind"	Alan Menken & Stephen Schwartz	Vanessa Williams and Judy Kuhn	Pocahontas
1996	"Have You Ever Really Loved a Woman?"	Bryan Adams, Michael Kamen & Robert John "Mutt" Lange	Bryan Adams	Don Juan DeMarco
1996	"Love Me Still"	Bruce Hornsby & Chaka Khan	Chaka Khan	Clockers
1996	"Someone to Love"	Babyface	Jon B. and Babyface	Bad Boys
1996	"Whatever You Imagine"	James Horner, Barry Mann & Cynthia Weil	Wendy Moten	The Pagemaster
1997
1997	"Because You Loved Me"	Diane Warren	Celine Dion	Up Close & Personal
1997	"Count On Me"	Babyface, Michael Houston & Whitney Houston	Whitney Houston and CeCe Winans	Waiting to Exhale
1997	"Exhale (Shoop Shoop)"	Babyface	Whitney Houston	Waiting to Exhale
1997	"It Hurts Like Hell"	Babyface	Aretha Franklin	Waiting to Exhale
1997	"Moonlight"	John Williams, Alan Bergman & Marilyn Bergman	Sting	Sabrina
1998
1998	"I Believe I Can Fly"	R. Kelly	R. Kelly	Space Jam
1998	"Father of Our Nation"	Cédric Gradus Samson	Jennifer Jones and Hugh Masekela	Mandela and de Klerk
1998	"For the First Time"	Jud Friedman, James Newton Howard & Allan Dennis Rich	Kenny Loggins	One Fine Day
1998	"How Do I Live"	Diane Warren	Trisha Yearwood	Con Air
1998	"A Song for Mama"	Babyface	Boyz II Men	Soul Food
1999
1999	"My Heart Will Go On"	James Horner & Will Jennings	Celine Dion	Titanic
1999	"I Don't Want to Miss a Thing"	Diane Warren	Aerosmith	Armageddon
1999	"Tomorrow Never Dies"	Sheryl Crow & Mitchell Froom	Sheryl Crow	Tomorrow Never Dies
1999	"True to Your Heart"	Matthew Wilder & David Zippel	98 Degrees and Stevie Wonder	Mulan
1999	"Uninvited"	Alanis Morissette	Alanis Morissette	City of Angels

=== 2000s ===
Year^{[I]}	Song	Nominee(s)	Performer(s)^{[II]}	Work
2000
2000	"Beautiful Stranger"	Madonna & William Orbit	Madonna	Austin Powers: The Spy Who Shagged Me
2000	"Music of My Heart"	Diane Warren	*NSYNC and Gloria Estefan	Music of the Heart
2000	"The Time of Your Life"	Randy Newman	Randy Newman	A Bug's Life
2000	"When You Believe"	Stephen Schwartz & Babyface	Mariah Carey and Whitney Houston	The Prince of Egypt
2000	"You'll Be in My Heart"	Phil Collins	Phil Collins	Tarzan
2001
2001	"When She Loved Me"	Randy Newman	Sarah McLachlan	Toy Story 2
2001	"The Great Beyond"	Peter Buck, Mike Mills & Michael Stipe	R.E.M.	Man on the Moon
2001	"Independent Women Part I"	Samuel J. Barnes, Beyoncé Knowles, Jean Claude Olivier & Cory Rooney	Destiny's Child	Charlie's Angels
2001	"Save Me"	Aimee Mann	Aimee Mann	Magnolia
2001	"Things Have Changed"	Bob Dylan	Bob Dylan	Wonder Boys
2002
2002	"Boss of Me"	John Flansburgh & John Linnell	They Might Be Giants	Malcolm in the Middle
2002	"A Love Before Time"	Jorge Calandrelli, Tan Dun & James Schamus	Coco Lee	Crouching Tiger, Hidden Dragon
2002	"My Funny Friend and Me"	David Hartley & Sting	Sting	The Emperor's New Groove
2002	"There You'll Be"	Diane Warren	Faith Hill	Pearl Harbor
2002	"Win"	Brandon Barnes & Brian McKnight	Brian McKnight	Men of Honor
2003
2003	"If I Didn't Have You"	Randy Newman	Randy Newman	Monsters, Inc.
2003	"Hero"	Chad Kroeger	Chad Kroeger and Josey Scott	Spider-Man
2003	"Love of My Life – An Ode to Hip Hop"	Erykah Badu, Madukwu Chinwah, Common, Robert C. Ozuna, James Poyser, Raphael Saadiq & Glen Standridge	Erykah Badu and Common	Brown Sugar
2003	"May It Be"	Enya, Nicky Ryan & Roma Ryan	Enya	The Lord of the Rings: The Fellowship of the Ring
2003	"Vanilla Sky"	Paul McCartney	Paul McCartney	Vanilla Sky
2004
2004	"A Mighty Wind"	Christopher Guest, Eugene Levy & Michael McKean	The Folksmen, Mitch & Mickey, and The New Main Street Singers	A Mighty Wind
2004	"Act a Fool"	Christopher Bridges & Keith McMasters	Ludacris	2 Fast 2 Furious
2004	"The Hands That Built America"	U2	U2	Gangs of New York
2004	"I Move On"	John Kander & Fred Ebb	Catherine Zeta-Jones & Renée Zellweger	Chicago
2004	"Lose Yourself"	Jeff Bass, Marshall Mathers & Luis Resto	Eminem	8 Mile
2005
2005	"Into the West"	Annie Lennox, Howard Shore & Fran Walsh	Annie Lennox	The Lord of the Rings: The Return of the King
2005	"Accidentally in Love"	David Bryson, Adam Duritz, David Immerglück, Matthew Malley & Dan Vickrey	Counting Crows	Shrek 2
2005	"Belleville Rendez-Vous"	Benoît Charest & Sylvain Chomet	-M-	The Triplets of Belleville
2005	"The Scarlet Tide"	T-Bone Burnett & Elvis Costello	Alison Krauss	Cold Mountain
2005	"You Will Be My Ain True Love"	Sting	Alison Krauss	Cold Mountain
2006
2006	"Believe"	Glen Ballard & Alan Silvestri	Josh Groban	The Polar Express
2006	"Cold Wind"	Arcade Fire	Arcade Fire	Six Feet Under
2006	"Million Voices"	Andrea Guerra, Wyclef Jean & Jerry "Wonda" Duplessis	Wyclef Jean	Hotel Rwanda
2006	"Square One"	Tom Petty	Tom Petty	Elizabethtown
2006	"Wonka's Welcome Song"	Danny Elfman & John August	Danny Elfman	Charlie and the Chocolate Factory
2007
2007	"Our Town"	Randy Newman	James Taylor	Cars
2007	"Can't Take It In"	Imogen Heap	Imogen Heap	The Chronicles of Narnia: The Lion, the Witch, and the Wardrobe
2007	"I Need to Wake Up"	Melissa Etheridge	Melissa Etheridge	An Inconvenient Truth
2007	"There's Nothing Like a Show on Broadway"	Mel Brooks	Nathan Lane & Matthew Broderick	The Producers
2007	"Travelin' Thru"	Dolly Parton	Dolly Parton	Transamerica
2008
2008	"Love You I Do"	Siedah Garrett & Henry Krieger	Jennifer Hudson	Dreamgirls
2008	"Falling Slowly"	Glen Hansard & Markéta Irglová	Glen Hansard & Markéta Irglová	Once
2008	"Guaranteed"	Eddie Vedder	Eddie Vedder	Into the Wild
2008	"Song of the Heart"	Prince	Prince	Happy Feet
2008	"You Know My Name"	David Arnold & Chris Cornell	Chris Cornell	Casino Royale
2009
2009	"Down to Earth"	Peter Gabriel & Thomas Newman	Peter Gabriel	WALL-E
2009	"Ever Ever After"	Alan Menken & Stephen Schwartz	Carrie Underwood	Enchanted
2009	"Say"	John Mayer	John Mayer	The Bucket List
2009	"That's How You Know"	Alan Menken & Stephen Schwartz	Amy Adams	Enchanted
2009	"Walk Hard"	Judd Apatow, Marshall Crenshaw, Jake Kasdan & John C. Reilly	John C. Reilly	Walk Hard: The Dewey Cox Story

=== 2010s ===
Year^{[I]}	Song	Nominee(s)	Performer(s)^{[II]}	Work
2010 (Note: "The Climb", written by Jessi Alexander and Jon Mabe, and featured in Hannah Montana: The Movie, was originally nominated but was withdrawn by Walt Disney Records because it had not been written specifically for a film as the category's eligibility rules require. NARAS released a statement thanking Disney for its honesty and announcing that "The Climb" had been replaced by "All Is Love", with the fifth highest initial votes.)
2010	"Jai Ho"	Gulzar, A. R. Rahman & Tanvi Shah	A.R. Rahman, Sukhvinder Singh, Tanvi Shah, Mahalaxmi Iyer & Vijay Prakash	Slumdog Millionaire
2010	"All Is Love"	Karen O & Nick Zinner	Karen O and the Kids	Where the Wild Things Are
2010	"Decode"	Josh Farro, Hayley Williams & Taylor York	Paramore	Twilight
2010	"Once in a Lifetime"	Ian Dench, James Dring, Amanda Ghost, Beyoncé Knowles, Scott McFarnon & Jody Street	Beyoncé	Cadillac Records
2010	"The Wrestler"	Bruce Springsteen	Bruce Springsteen	The Wrestler
2011
2011	"The Weary Kind"	Ryan Bingham & T Bone Burnett	Ryan Bingham	Crazy Heart
2011	"Down in New Orleans"	Randy Newman	Dr. John	The Princess and the Frog
2011	"I See You"	James Horner, Simon Franglen & Thaddis Harrell	Leona Lewis	Avatar
2011	"Kiss Like Your Kiss"	Lucinda Williams	Lucinda Williams and Elvis Costello	True Blood
2011	"This City"	Steve Earle	Steve Earle	Treme
2012
2012	"I See the Light"	Alan Menken & Glenn Slater	Mandy Moore & Zachary Levi	Tangled
2012	"Born to Be Somebody"	Diane Warren	Justin Bieber	Justin Bieber: Never Say Never
2012	"Christmastime Is Killing Us"	Ron Jones, Seth MacFarlane & Danny Smith	Bruce McGill & Seth MacFarlane	Family Guy
2012	"So Long"	Zooey Deschanel	Zooey Deschanel and M. Ward	Winnie The Pooh
2012	"Where the River Goes"	Zac Brown, Wyatt Durrette, Drew Pearson & Anne Preven	Zac Brown	Footloose
2012	"You Haven't Seen the Last of Me"	Diane Warren	Cher	Burlesque
2013
2013	"Safe & Sound"	T Bone Burnett, Taylor Swift, Joy Williams & John Paul White	Taylor Swift featuring The Civil Wars	The Hunger Games
2013	"Abraham's Daughter"	T Bone Burnett, Win Butler & Regine Chassagne	Arcade Fire	The Hunger Games
2013	"Learn Me Right"	Mumford & Sons	Birdy and Mumford & Sons	Brave
2013	"Let Me Be Your Star"	Marc Shaiman & Scott Wittman	Katharine McPhee & Megan Hilty	Smash
2013	"Man or Muppet"	Bret McKenzie	Jason Segel and Walter	The Muppets
2014
2014	"Skyfall"	Adele Adkins & Paul Epworth	Adele	Skyfall
2014	"Atlas"	Guy Berryman, Jonny Buckland, Will Champion & Chris Martin	Coldplay	The Hunger Games: Catching Fire
2014	"Silver Lining (Crazy 'Bout You)"	Diane Warren	Jessie J	Silver Linings Playbook
2014	"We Both Know"	Colbie Caillat & Gavin DeGraw	Colbie Caillat & Gavin DeGraw	Safe Haven
2014	"You've Got Time"	Regina Spektor	Regina Spektor	Orange Is the New Black
2014	"Young and Beautiful"	Elizabeth Grant & Rick Nowels	Lana Del Rey	The Great Gatsby
2015
2015	"Let It Go"	Kristen Anderson-Lopez & Robert Lopez	Idina Menzel	Frozen
2015	"Everything Is Awesome"	Andy Samberg, Akiva Schaffer, Jorma Taccone, Joshua Bartholomew, Lisa Harriton & Shawn Patterson	Tegan and Sara and The Lonely Island	The Lego Movie
2015	"I See Fire"	Ed Sheeran	Ed Sheeran	The Hobbit: The Desolation of Smaug
2015	"I'm Not Gonna Miss You"	Glen Campbell & Julian Raymond	Glen Campbell	Glen Campbell: I'll Be Me
2015	"The Moon Song"	Spike Jonze & Karen O	Scarlett Johansson and Joaquin Phoenix	Her
2016
2016	"Glory"	Common, Che Smith & John Legend	Common and John Legend	Selma
2016	"Earned It"	Belly, Deheala, Stephan Moccio & Abel Tesfaye	The Weeknd	Fifty Shades of Grey
2016	"Love Me like You Do"	Ilya, Savan Kotecha, Max Martin, Tove Lo & Ali Payami	Ellie Goulding	Fifty Shades of Grey
2016	"See You Again"	Andrew Cedar, DJ Frank E, Wiz Khalifa & Charlie Puth	Wiz Khalifa featuring Charlie Puth	Furious 7
2016	"Til It Happens to You"	Lady Gaga & Diane Warren	Lady Gaga	The Hunting Ground
2017
2017	"Can't Stop the Feeling!"	Max Martin, Shellback & Justin Timberlake	Justin Timberlake	Trolls
2017	"Heathens"	Tyler Joseph	Twenty One Pilots	Suicide Squad
2017	"Just Like Fire"	Oscar Holter, Max Martin, P!nk & Shellback	P!nk	Alice Through the Looking Glass
2017	"Purple Lamborghini"	Shamann Cooke, Sonny Moore & William Roberts	Skrillex & Rick Ross	Suicide Squad
2017	"Try Everything"	Sia Furler & Stargate	Shakira	Zootopia
2017	"The Veil"	Peter Gabriel	Peter Gabriel	Snowden
2018
2018	"How Far I'll Go"	Lin-Manuel Miranda	Auli'i Cravalho	Moana
2018	"City of Stars"	Justin Hurwitz, Benj Pasek & Justin Paul	Ryan Gosling and Emma Stone	La La Land
2018	"I Don't Wanna Live Forever"	Jack Antonoff, Sam Dew & Taylor Swift	Zayn and Taylor Swift	Fifty Shades Darker
2018	"Never Give Up"	Greg Kurstin & Sia Furler	Sia	Lion
2018	"Stand Up for Something"	Common & Diane Warren	Andra Day featuring Common	Marshall
2019
2019	"Shallow"	Lady Gaga, Mark Ronson, Anthony Rossomando & Andrew Wyatt	Lady Gaga and Bradley Cooper	A Star Is Born
2019	"All the Stars"	Kendrick Duckworth, Solána Rowe, Alexander William Shuckburgh, Mark Anthony Spears & Anthony Tiffith	Kendrick Lamar and SZA	Black Panther
2019	"Mystery of Love"	Sufjan Stevens	Sufjan Stevens	Call Me by Your Name
2019	"Remember Me"	Kristen Anderson-Lopez & Robert Lopez	Miguel and Natalia Lafourcade	Coco
2019	"This Is Me"	Benj Pasek & Justin Paul	Keala Settle & The Greatest Showman Ensemble	The Greatest Showman

=== 2020s ===
Year^{[I]}	Song	Nominee(s)	Performer(s)^{[II]}	Work
2020
2020	"I'll Never Love Again"	Lady Gaga, Natalie Hemby, Hillary Lindsey & Aaron Raitiere	Lady Gaga and Bradley Cooper	A Star Is Born
2020	"The Ballad of the Lonesome Cowboy"	Randy Newman	Chris Stapleton	Toy Story 4
2020	"Girl in the Movies"	Dolly Parton & Linda Perry	Dolly Parton	Dumplin'
2020	"Spirit"	Beyoncé Knowles-Carter, Timothy McKenzie & Ilya Salmanzadeh	Beyoncé	The Lion King
2020	"Suspirium"	Thom Yorke	Thom Yorke	Suspiria
2021
2021	"No Time to Die"	Billie Eilish O'Connell & Finneas O'Connell	Billie Eilish	No Time to Die
2021	"Beautiful Ghosts"	Andrew Lloyd Webber & Taylor Swift	Taylor Swift	Cats
2021	"Carried Me With You"	Brandi Carlile, Phil and Tim Hanseroth	Brandi Carlile	Onward
2021	"Into the Unknown"	Kristen Anderson-Lopez & Robert Lopez	Idina Menzel and Aurora	Frozen 2
2021	"Stand Up"	Joshuah Brian Campbell & Cynthia Erivo	Cynthia Erivo	Harriet
2022
2022	"All Eyes on Me"	Bo Burnham	Bo Burnham	Bo Burnham: Inside
2022	"Agatha All Along"	Kristen Anderson-Lopez & Robert Lopez	Kristen Anderson-Lopez & Robert Lopez featuring Kathryn Hahn, Eric Bradley, Greg Whipple, Jasper Randall & Gerald White	WandaVision
2022	"All I Know So Far"	Alecia Moore, Benj Pasek & Justin Paul	Pink	Pink: All I Know So Far
2022	"Fight for You"	Dernst Emile II, Gabriella Wilson & Tiara Thomas	H.E.R.	Judas and the Black Messiah
2022	"Here I Am (Singing My Way Home)"	Jamie Hartman, Jennifer Hudson & Carole Klein	Jennifer Hudson	Respect
2022	"Speak Now"	Sam Ashworth & Leslie Odom Jr.	Leslie Odom Jr.	One Night in Miami...
2023
2023	"We Don't Talk About Bruno"	Lin-Manuel Miranda	Carolina Gaitán, Mauro Castillo, Adassa, Rhenzy Feliz, Diane Guerrero, Stephanie Beatriz and Encanto Cast	Encanto
2023	"Be Alive"	Beyoncé Knowles-Carter & Darius Dixson Scott	Beyoncé	King Richard
2023	"Carolina"	Taylor Swift	Taylor Swift	Where the Crawdads Sing
2023	"Hold My Hand"	Michael Tucker & Stefani Germanotta	Lady Gaga	Top Gun: Maverick
2023	"Keep Rising (The Woman King)"	Angélique Kidjo, Jeremy Lutito & Jessy Wilson	Jessy Wilson featuring Angélique Kidjo	The Woman King
2023	"Nobody Like U"	Billie Eilish O'Connell & Finneas O'Connell	4*Town, Jordan Fisher, Finneas O'Connell, Josh Levi, Topher Ngo & Grayson Villanueva	Turning Red
2024
2024	"What Was I Made For?"	Billie Eilish O'Connell & Finneas O'Connell	Billie Eilish	Barbie
2024	"Barbie World"	Isis Naija Gaston, Ephrem Louis Lopez Jr. & Onika Maraj	Nicki Minaj & Ice Spice featuring Aqua	Barbie
2024	"Dance the Night"	Caroline Ailin, Dua Lipa, Mark Ronson & Andrew Wyatt	Dua Lipa	Barbie
2024	"I'm Just Ken"	Mark Ronson & Andrew Wyatt	Ryan Gosling	Barbie
2024	"Lift Me Up"	Ryan Coogler, Ludwig Göransson, Robyn Fenty & Temilade Openiyi	Rihanna	Black Panther: Wakanda Forever
2025
2025	"It Never Went Away"	Jon Batiste & Dan Wilson	Jon Batiste	American Symphony
2025	"Ain't No Love in Oklahoma"	Jessie Alexander, Luke Combs & Johnathan Singleton	Luke Combs	Twisters
2025	"Better Place"	Amy Allen, Shellback & Justin Timberlake	*NSYNC & Justin Timberlake	Trolls Band Together
2025	"Can't Catch Me Now"	Dan Nigro & Olivia Rodrigo	Olivia Rodrigo	The Hunger Games: The Ballad of Songbirds & Snakes
2025	"Love Will Survive"	Walter Afanasieff, Charlie Midnight, Kara Talve & Hans Zimmer	Barbra Streisand	The Tattooist of Auschwitz
2026
2026	"Golden"	Park Hong Jun, Joong Gyu Kwak, Yu Han Lee, Hee Dong Nam, Jeong Hoon Seo, Ejae & Mark Sonnenblick	Huntrix: Ejae, Audrey Nuna & Rei Ami	KPop Demon Hunters
2026	"As Alive as You Need Me to Be"	Trent Reznor & Atticus Ross	Nine Inch Nails	Tron: Ares
2026	"I Lied to You"	Ludwig Göransson & Raphael Saadiq	Miles Caton	Sinners
2026	"Never Too Late"	Brandi Carlile, Elton John, Bernie Taupin & Andrew Watt	Elton John & Brandi Carlile	Elton John: Never Too Late
2026	"Pale, Pale Moon"	Ludwig Göransson & Brittany Howard	Jayme Lawson	Sinners
2026	"Sinners"	Leonard Denisenko, Rodarius Green, Travis Harrington, Tarkan Kozluklu, Kyris Mingo & Darius Poviliunas	Rod Wave	Sinners
2027	"House"	John Cale & Charlotte Aitchison	Charli XCX & John Cale	Wuthering Heights
2027	"I Knew It, I Knew You"	Jack Antonoff & Taylor Swift	Taylor Swift	Toy Story 5
2027	"Need Someone"	Andrew Bird	Andrew Bird & Gavin Brivik	The Pitt
2027	“No Place Like Home”	Stephen Schwartz	Cynthia Erivo	Wicked: For Good
2027	“Runway”	Henry Walter, Jaylah Hickmon, Dernst *“D’Mile” Emile II, Stefani Germanotta, Jayda Love, Bruno Mars & Andrew Watt	Lady Gaga and Doechii	The Devil Wears Prada 2

- ^{^[I]} Each year is linked to the article about the Grammy Awards held that year.
- ^{^[II]} The performing artist is only listed but does not receive the award.

== Superlatives ==
The following nominees have earned at least two wins and nominations:

=== Nominations ===
Nominations	Songwriter
11
11	Diane Warren
9
9	Alan Menken
7
7	Randy Newman
6	Babyface
5	Taylor Swift
5	Stephen Schwartz
5	Lady Gaga
4
4	Kristen Anderson-Lopez
4	Howard Ashman
4	Beyoncé
4	James Horner
4	Robert Lopez
3
3	T Bone Burnett
3	Billie Eilish
3	Michael Kamen
3	Robert John "Mutt" Lange
3	Madonna
3	Max Martin
3	Finneas O'Connell
3	Benj Pasek
3	Justin Paul
3	Tim Rice
3	Mark Ronson
3	Sting
3	John Williams
3	Stevie Wonder
3	Andrew Wyatt
2
2	Bryan Adams
2	Alan Bergman
2	Marilyn Bergman
2	Win Butler
2	Eric Clapton
2	Phil Collins
2	Common
2	Alan Dennis Rich
2	Jud Friedman
2	Peter Gabriel
2	Albert Hammond
2	Will Jennings
2	Elton John
2	Patrick Leonard
2	Barry Mann
2	Lin-Manuel Miranda
2	Karen O
2	Dolly Parton
2	P!nk
2	Prince
2	Ilya Salmanzadeh
2	Sia
2	Stephen Sondheim
2	Bruce Springsteen
2	U2
2	Cynthia Weil
2	Jack Antonoff
2	Cynthia Erivo

=== Multiple wins ===
Wins	Songwriter
5	Alan Menken
3	Randy Newman
2	Howard Ashman
2	T Bone Burnett
2	Billie Eilish
2	Lady Gaga
2	James Horner
2	Lin-Manuel Miranda
2	Finneas O'Connell

== Name changes ==
- 1988–1999: The Grammy Award for Best Song Written Specifically for a Motion Picture or for Television
- 2000–2011: The Grammy Award for Best Song Written for a Motion Picture, Television or Other Visual Media
- 2012–present: The Grammy Award for Best Song Written for Visual Media
