= All I Know So Far (song) =

2021 song by Pink

Single by Pink

from the album All I Know So Far: Setlist
- Released: May 7, 2021
- Length: 4:40: 3:38 (Radio edit)
- Label: RCA
- Songwriters: Alecia Beth Moore; Benj Pasek; Justin Paul
- Producer: Greg Kurstin

Pink singles chronology
"Anywhere Away from Here" (2021)	"All I Know So Far" (2021)	"Irrelevant" (2022)

Music video
- "All I Know So Far" on YouTube

"All I Know So Far" is a song by American singer and songwriter Pink. It was written by herself, Justin Paul and Benj Pasek with production by Greg Kurstin. The song was released on May 7, 2021, as a single through RCA Records from her live retrospective album All I Know So Far: Setlist.

The song received a nomination for Grammy Award for Best Song Written for Visual Media at the 64th Annual Grammy Awards.

== Background ==
"All I Know So Far" is based on Pink's life and career and was envisioned as an advice-filled love letter to her daughter. It was announced on April 29, 2021, as the title track to her Amazon documentary and the second single from the associated soundtrack following "Cover Me in Sunshine". Lyrically, the song tackles themes of perseverance and strength in the face of adversity.

Talking about the song's release with Fleur East on Hits Radio, Pink explained "It's always nerve wracking, but it's exciting. I think it’s a little more pressure because it's kind of the song of my life. I was put under zero pressure to try and encapsulate my life in 3 minutes! So I wrote a letter to Willow and put it to a melody and here it is".

== Tracklist ==
Digital Remixes – EP

1. "All I Know So Far" (Cedric Gervais Remix) – 3:10
2. "All I Know So Far" (Syn Cole Remix) – 2:56
3. "All I Know So Far" (Luca Schreiner Remix) – 2:44
4. "All I Know So Far" (Dubdogz & Selva Remix) – 3:36

Other Versions

- 7th Heaven Club Mix – 6:35
- 7th Heaven Radio Edit – 3:09

== Music video ==
Released on May 7, 2021, the music video for "All I Know So Far" was directed by Dave Meyers, Pink's longtime collaborator who has directed sixteen of her previous videos throughout her career. In a statement to Vulture, Pink explained: "Dave Meyers and I are back together again. Since this song is sort of the story of my life and a letter to my daughter, making this video with Dave after we did our first video together 22 years ago is a really special full circle moment. He's truly a genius and I am full of gratitude for our friendship and to experience all the times we’ve been able to work together". Myers added "The saga of me and P!nk is very long and it is very rewarding we are so close. I have the longest stretch of my career with her so there's always been a kind of brother/sister relationship that we've had. The beauty of where P!nk and I are now is really the culmination of 22 years of friendship. In this video, I am trying to capture the full breadth of who she is, where she has been and the troubled youth that's evolved into this idea of the power of community. It is where we are in the world right now and displays the idea that we really need each other".

The video features appearances from actress Judith Light, singer and actress Cher, Pink's husband Carey Hart and their children Willow Sage and Jameson Moon Hart.

The video was nominated for the MTV Video Music Award for Best Visual Effects.

=== Synopsis ===
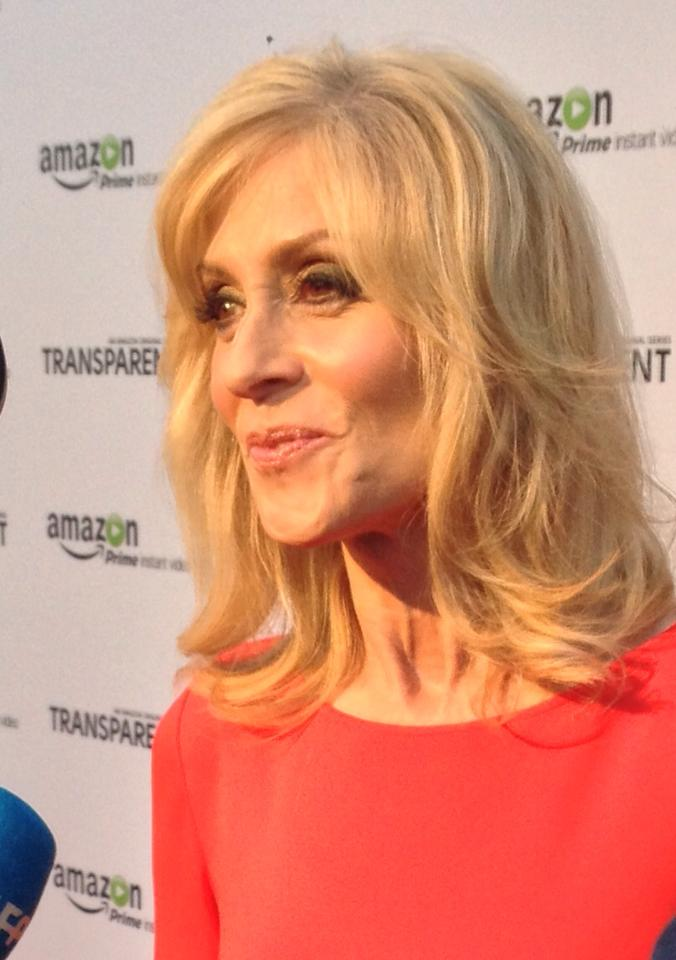
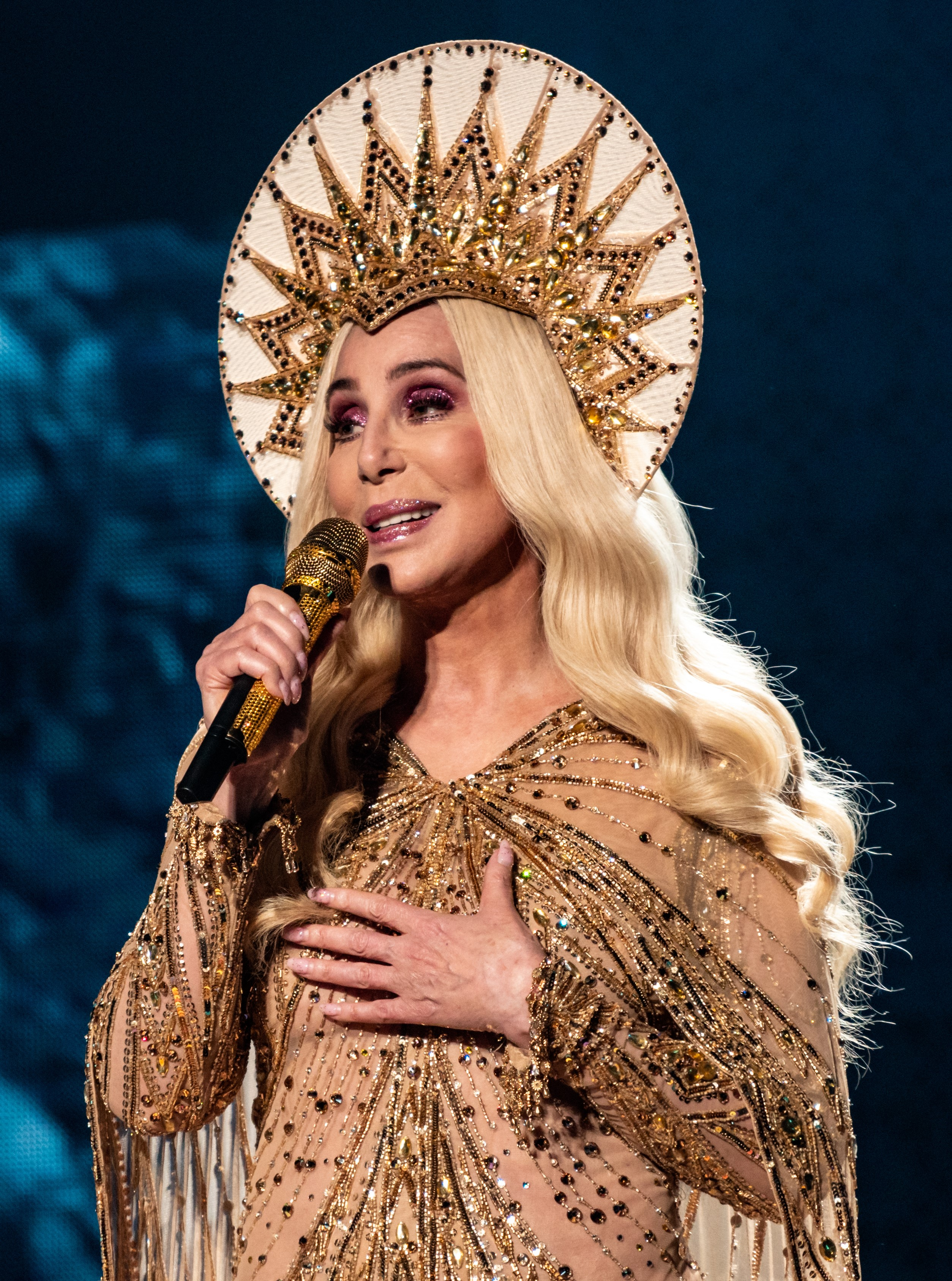
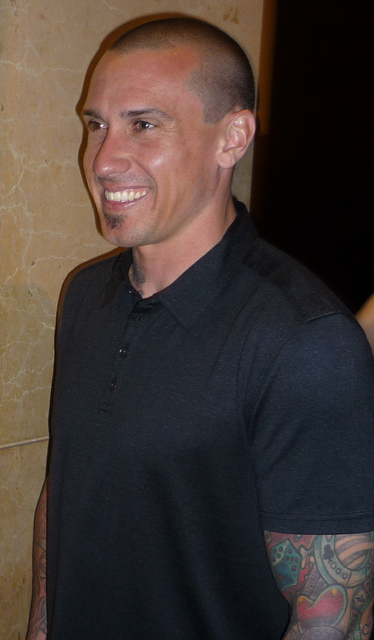
The video features cameos from Judith Light, Cher and Carey Hart

The video begins with Pink reading a bedtime story to her daughter Willow, who is fed up of fairy tales and her mother's penchant for rhyming and singing as she tells her stories. She talks about her childhood, describing a girl who was angry at the world and constantly agrued with her alcoholic mother. The young Pink jumps from her childhood home and lands as an adult in a world filled with music executives depicted as three giant goblins in suits. She takes a boat to an island, where she meets her husband Hart and falls in love. Pink gets angry at Hart and tries to kill him three times. The scene switches to black and white and features Pink pushing away masked people who are trying to catch her. Pink makes peace with her mother and the two embrace under a sunset.

Back in the present, Pink kisses Willow on the forehead as the latter falls asleep - and back in the field - she hugs Willow as a massive explosion comes towards them, leaving them as two skeletons as she utters the final line: "I will be with you until the world blows up".

=== Reception ===
The video received critical acclaim and accumulated more than four million views on YouTube in its first week of release. Jem Asward of Variety stated that Pink and Meyers had "outdone themselves with their 16th and latest collaboration for her new song 'All I Know So Far,' which combines eye-popping special effects, guest appearances from Cher, Tony-winning actress Judith Light and Pink’s family—and a heart-rending, family-based, female-empowerment storyline that contains multiple comic, easter-egg references". The review went on to praise the numerous references to various popular films including The Princess Bride, Titanic, The Lord of the Rings and Terminator 2 and the references to previous Pink videos including "Funhouse" and "Raise Your Glass".

== Credits and personnel ==
Credits adapted from Tidal.

- Pink – vocals, songwriting, co-production
- Benj Pasek – songwriting, co-production
- Justin Paul – songwriting, co-production
- Greg Kurstin – production, engineering, bass, drums, guitar, keyboards, percussion, piano
- Justin Derrico – acoustic guitar
- John Hanes – engineering
- Julian Burg – engineering
- Simon Gooding – engineering
- Serban Ghenea – mixing
- Dave Kutch – mastering

== Charts ==
=== Weekly charts ===
Weekly chart performance for "All I Know So Far"
Chart (2021–2022)	Peak position
Australia (ARIA)	25
Austria (Ö3 Austria Top 40)	68
Belgium (Ultratop 50 Flanders)	47
Belgium (Ultratop 50 Wallonia)	32
Canada Hot 100 (Billboard)	30
Canada AC (Billboard)	1
Canada CHR/Top 40 (Billboard)	47
Canada Hot AC (Billboard)	5
Croatia (HRT)	13
Finland Airplay (Radiosoittolista)	51
Germany (GfK)	75
Global 200 (Billboard)	65
Hungary (Single Top 40)	12
Iceland (Tónlistinn)	30
Ireland (IRMA)	52
Netherlands (Dutch Top 40)	29
Netherlands (Single Top 100)	64
New Zealand Hot Singles (RMNZ)	6
Slovakia Airplay (ČNS IFPI)	9
Sweden (Sverigetopplistan)	99
Switzerland (Schweizer Hitparade)	48
UK Singles (OCC)	39
US Billboard Hot 100	74
US Adult Contemporary (Billboard)	9
US Adult Pop Airplay (Billboard)	8

=== Year-end charts ===
Year-end chart performance for "All I Know So Far"
Chart (2021)	Position
Canada (Canadian Hot 100)	76
US Adult Contemporary (Billboard)	19
US Adult Top 40 (Billboard)	27

== Certifications ==
Certifications for "All I Know So Far"
Region	Certification	Certified units/sales
Australia (ARIA)	Platinum	70,000^{‡}
Canada (Music Canada)	Platinum	80,000^{‡}
New Zealand (RMNZ)	Gold	15,000^{‡}
United Kingdom (BPI)	Gold	400,000^{‡}
^{‡} Sales+streaming figures based on certification alone.

== Release history ==
Release dates and formats for "All I Know So Far"
Region	Date	Format	Label	Ref.
Various	May 7, 2021	Digital download; streaming	RCA	
United States	May 10, 2021	Adult contemporary radio	RCA	
Australia	May 14, 2021	Contemporary hit radio	Sony	
Italy	May 28, 2021	Contemporary hit radio	Sony	
United States	June 8, 2021	Contemporary hit radio	RCA	
