= Cover Me in Sunshine =

2021 song by Pink and Willow Sage Hart

Single by Pink and Willow Sage Hart

from the album All I Know So Far: Setlist
- Released: February 12, 2021
- Genre: Pop
- Length: 2:37
- Label: RCA
- Songwriters: Amy Allen; Maureen "Mozella" McDonald
- Producer: A Strut (Ludwig Söderberg)

Pink singles chronology
"One Too Many" (2020)	"Cover Me in Sunshine" (2021)	"Anywhere Away from Here" (2021)

Music video
- "Cover Me in Sunshine" on YouTube

"Cover Me in Sunshine" is a song by American singer and songwriter Pink and her daughter Willow Sage Hart. It was written by Amy Allen and Mozella with production by A Strut (Ludwig Söderberg). The song debuted via video-sharing social media platform TikTok on February 8, while the full version was released on February 12, 2021, as a single through RCA Records.

The track was met with positive reviews, with critics calling it "adorable" and praising both performers' vocals. The accompanying music video was published alongside the single release, featuring Pink and Willow Sage on their family ranch and winery in California. While not charting in the US, the song achieved success overseas, topping the charts in Belgium (Wallonia), Romania and Slovakia, while reaching the top-ten in Australia, Austria, the Czech Republic, Germany, Latvia, the Netherlands, Norway, Slovenia and Switzerland, and in the top 40 of Croatia, Hungary, France, Ireland, New Zealand and Russia. It is certified Diamond in France and Platinum or higher in nine additional countries, including Australia, Denmark, New Zealand and Canada.

== Background and composition ==
In 2018, Pink's daughter Willow Sage Hart (born on June 2, 2011) released a cover of the reprise of "A Million Dreams (Reprise)" for The Greatest Showman: Reimagined soundtrack. In 2019, Pink told Entertainment Tonight she would do a collaboration with her daughter in the future. In November 2019, Pink took a break from music to focus more on her family. In March 2020, she and her son were diagnosed with COVID-19.

On February 8, 2021, Pink released an a cappella preview of the "Cover Me in Sunshine" chorus, sung by her daughter, on her TikTok account. Two days later, Pink revealed that the full version of the song would be released on February 12, and also released a video, which emphasized her collaboration with her daughter:

I love singing with my daughter and my son. (...) But we have this song called "Cover Me in Sunshine" that we recorded at home because it made us feel happy and so we're going to put it out for no other reason than that we hope that the song makes you feel happy. We thought we'd put it out around Valentine's Day as a big old hug and a kiss from us to all y'all.

It is an upbeat and mid-tempo pop song containing positive lyrics backed up by acoustic guitars. Pink sings the first verse and chorus with backing vocals provided by her daughter, while Hart sings an outro on her own. The song is composed in the key of F major; Pink's vocals range from F_{3} to Bb_{4}.

== Reception ==
Justin Curto from Vulture wrote that song contains "some bright and warm harmonies between a mother and her child to get you through the end of the week". Entertainment Tonight's Liz Calvario called the duo "the cutest twosome around" and described Willow Sage Hart's voice as "impressive". Julia Barajas of Los Angeles Times also praised Willow Sage's vocals, calling them "fabulous". Nicholas Rise from People called the track "upbeat and positive". while ABC News Radio's Megan Stone described the track as "adorable". Billboard's Gil Kaufman called the song "inspirational" and "dreamy", while describing song's chorus as "bright and poppy".

In the US "Cover Me in Sunshine" failed to chart in Hot 100, however it peaked at number four in Bubbling Under Hot 100 chart with 2 million streams and 11,000 downloads. In Canada the song peaked at number 60, and globally it debuted at number 104 on Global 200 and 133 on Global 200 Excl. US charts. On April 17, 2021 the song achieved peak of number 90 on Global 200 chart and number 60 on its Excl. US counterpart. In Europe the song got a placement within top 40 of Austria, Croatia, Flanders, Germany, Hungary, the Netherlands, Russia, and Switzerland. In Australia the track became Pink's 27th top ten single at the third week of charting by moving from number 16 to 10. It ascended to number eight following week, peaking at number six next week. "Cover Me in Sunshine" was certified gold by Australian Recording Industry Association for shipping 35,000 copies.

== Music video ==
The music video for "Cover Me in Sunshine" was released on the same day as the song and was "made [sic]" by both Pink and Willow Hart. The video was recorded on Pink's family ranch and winery near Santa Barbara, California. It features the singer and her daughter having fun in nature, riding horses, collecting chicken eggs and being in a boat. Corinne Heller of E! Online commented that the video "resembles an old home video".

== Credits and personnel ==
Credits adapted from Tidal.

- Pink – vocals
- Willow Sage Hart – vocals
- Amy Allen – songwriting, guitar
- Maureen "Mozella" McDonald – songwriting
- A Strut – production
- Ludvig Söderberg – bass, keyboards, programming, production
- Fat Max Gsus – guitar
- John Hanes – engineering
- Serban Ghenea – mixing
- Dave Kutch – mastering

== Charts ==
=== Weekly charts ===
Weekly chart performance for "Cover Me in Sunshine"
Chart (2021)	Peak position
Australia (ARIA)	6
Austria (Ö3 Austria Top 40)	3
Belgium (Ultratop 50 Flanders)	6
Belgium (Ultratop 50 Wallonia)	1
Canada Hot 100 (Billboard)	60
Canada Hot AC (Billboard)	46
CIS Airplay (TopHit)	21
Croatia (HRT)	15
Czech Republic Airplay (ČNS IFPI)	2
Czech Republic Singles Digital (ČNS IFPI)	7
Denmark Airplay (Tracklisten)	2
Euro Digital Song Sales (Billboard)	3
Finland (Suomen virallinen lista)	20
France (SNEP)	26
France Airplay (SNEP)	1
Germany (GfK)	7
Germany Airplay (BVMI)	1
Global 200 (Billboard)	49
Hungary (Rádiós Top 40)	30
Hungary (Single Top 40)	19
Ireland (IRMA)	30
Latvia (EHR)	2
Lebanon (Lebanese Top 20)	15
Lithuania (AGATA)	42
Netherlands (Dutch Top 40)	4
Netherlands (Single Top 100)	8
New Zealand (Recorded Music NZ)	24
Norway (VG-lista)	4
Portugal (AFP)	131
Romania (Airplay 100)	1
Russia Airplay (TopHit)	21
Slovakia Airplay (ČNS IFPI)	1
Slovakia Singles Digital (ČNS IFPI)	8
Slovenia (SloTop50)	2
South Africa (RISA)	71
Sweden (Sverigetopplistan)	28
Switzerland (Schweizer Hitparade)	4
UK Singles (Official Charts)	52
US Bubbling Under Hot 100 (Billboard)	4

=== Year-end charts ===
2021 year-end chart performance for "Cover Me in Sunshine"
Chart (2021)	Position
Australia (ARIA)	18
Austria (Ö3 Austria Top 40)	15
Belgium (Ultratop Flanders)	15
Belgium (Ultratop Wallonia)	8
CIS (TopHit)	47
Croatia (ARC Top 40)	14
Denmark (Tracklisten)	71
France (SNEP)	75
Germany (Official German Charts)	21
Global 200 (Billboard)	163
Hungary (Rádiós Top 40)	96
Netherlands (Dutch Top 40)	27
Netherlands (Single Top 100)	47
Norway (VG-lista)	19
Russia Airplay (TopHit)	71
Sweden (Sverigetopplistan)	64
Switzerland (Schweizer Hitparade)	11

2022 year-end chart performance for "Cover Me in Sunshine"
Chart (2022)	Position
Belgium (Ultratop 50 Flanders)	179
Belgium (Ultratop 50 Wallonia)	168

== Certifications ==
Certifications for "Cover Me in Sunshine"
Region	Certification	Certified units/sales
Australia (ARIA)	4× Platinum	280,000^{‡}
Austria (IFPI Austria)	Platinum	30,000^{‡}
Belgium (BRMA)	Platinum	40,000^{‡}
Canada (Music Canada)	2× Platinum	160,000^{‡}
Denmark (IFPI Danmark)	Platinum	90,000^{‡}
France (SNEP)	Diamond	333,333^{‡}
Germany (BVMI)	Platinum	400,000^{‡}
New Zealand (RMNZ)	3× Platinum	90,000^{‡}
Switzerland (IFPI Switzerland)	Platinum	20,000^{‡}
United Kingdom (BPI)	Gold	400,000^{‡}
Streaming
Sweden (GLF)	2× Platinum	16,000,000^{†}
^{‡} Sales+streaming figures based on certification alone.^{†} Streaming-only figures based on certification alone.

== Release history ==
Release dates and formats for "Cover Me in Sunshine"
Region	Date	Format	Label	Ref.
Various	February 12, 2021	Digital download; streaming	RCA	

== See also ==
- List of Airplay 100 number ones of the 2020s
