= Miracle Mile (song) =

Single by Cold War Kids

from the album Dear Miss Lonelyhearts
- Released: February 5, 2013 (iTunes)
- Recorded: 2012
- Genre: Indie rock
- Length: 3:00
- Label: Downtown, V2
- Songwriter: Nathan Willett
- Producers: Lars Stalfors; Dann Gallucci

Cold War Kids singles chronology
"Minimum Day" (2012)	"Miracle Mile" (2013)	"A Million Eyes" (2014)

Music video
- "Miracle Mile" on YouTube

"Miracle Mile" is a song by American indie rock band Cold War Kids. The song was written by lead singer Nathan Willett and produced by Lars Stalfors (Matt & Kim) and Dann Gallucci (Modest Mouse). It was the sole single off their fourth album Dear Miss Lonelyhearts (2013) and was released on February 5, 2013.

"Miracle Mile" was given positive reviews from critics who called it a highlight on Dear Miss Lonelyhearts. The song peaked at number 22 on the Billboard Alternative Songs chart. A music video was made for the single and premiered in April 2013.

== Critical reception ==
"Miracle Mile" received a positive reception from music critics. Philip Cosores of Paste called it a "hook-heavy foot stomper." AllMusic's Heather Phares praised the song for being a merger of "both the slickness of Mine Is Yours and the theatrics of Loyalty to Loyalty." Kevin Perry of NME felt the piano sounded exhilarating and liked that the band "stopped trying to do indie rock by numbers and gone back to the sort of idiosyncratic weirdness that made us fall for them in the first place."

== Chart performance ==
"Miracle Mile" debuted on the Billboard Alternative Songs chart at number 37 and peaked at number 22, their fifth top 40 hit on that chart. It was their highest-charting single to date since 2006's "Hang Me Up to Dry" until "First" (2015). It stayed on the chart for nineteen weeks, making this their second longest charting single to date, also behind "First".

== Music video ==
Directed by Vern Moen (who previously directed their videos for "Audience" and "Louder Than Ever"), the video was mostly shot in black-and-white and occasionally red during the middle part. The video was uploaded on the band's YouTube page on April 11, 2013. The video was made available the next day on iTunes.

== Live performances ==
Cold War Kids performed "Miracle Mile" and "Loner Phase" on Jimmy Kimmel Live! on April 2, 2013. They performed the song again on the Late Show with David Letterman on July 18, 2013.

== In popular culture ==
- The song was featured in the season 4 episode "Bring It On" of The CW series The Vampire Diaries.
- The song was featured in Episode 1 of 24/7 Road to the Winter Classic: Toronto Maple Leafs vs. Detroit Red Wings.
- The song was featured in the season 9 episode "Transplant Wasteland" of the ABC series Grey's Anatomy.
- The song was featured on the NBC series Camp in the episode "Valentine's Day in July".
- The song was used as a video montage of the Super Bowl XLIX highlights between the New England Patriots and the Seattle Seahawks on the NFL Network.
- The song is featured as part of the Pro Evolution Soccer 2015 soundtrack.
- The song was featured in the 2014 film Premature.

== Charts ==
Chart (2013)	Peak position
US Rock & Alternative Airplay (Billboard)	48
US Alternative Airplay (Billboard)	22
