= Mine Is Yours =

Studio album by Cold War Kids
- Released: January 25, 2011
- Recorded: February–March, August 2010
- Studios: Ocean Way, Nashville; House of David, Nashville; The Smoakstack, Nashville; The LBT, Nashville; Sunset Sound, Hollywood
- Genre: Indie rock
- Length: 44:24 (standard edition); 53:57 (deluxe edition)
- Labels: Downtown; Interscope; V2
- Producer: Jacquire King

Cold War Kids chronology
Behave Yourself (2010)	Mine Is Yours (2011)	Dear Miss Lonelyhearts (2013)

Singles from Mine Is Yours
- 1. "Louder Than Ever" Released: December 14, 2010; 2. "Skip the Charades" Released: February 8, 2011

Mine Is Yours is the third studio album by American indie rock band Cold War Kids. It was released on January 25, 2011, by Downtown Records.

Following the releases of Loyalty to Loyalty (2008) and Behave Yourself (2010), the band sought to work on new material that spanned the course of three months in Nashville and California after two years of touring. Produced by Jacquire King, responsible for the mainstream success of fellow American rock band Kings of Leon, the album deviates from the band's dark blues rock-influenced folk tales heard in their previous records into a more mainstream sound with lyrics that talked about personal relationships.

Mine Is Yours debuted at number 21 on the Billboard 200 and spawned four singles (two official and two promotional): "Louder Than Ever", "Skip the Charades", "Finally Begin" and "Royal Blue". The album received a mixed response from critics, with reviews divided by the band's change in sound and lyrical content. To promote the record, the band toured across North America and Europe with appearances at music festivals and talk shows. Mine Is Yours was the band's last album to feature lead guitarist Jonnie Russell, who left for personal reasons.

== Background and recording ==
Cold War Kids released their sophomore album Loyalty to Loyalty on September 23, 2008. The album received a generally favorable reception but critics found it uneven in terms of songwriting and performance. To promote the record, the band spent the next two years touring across North America and Europe making appearances at music festivals and talk shows. After the release of their seventh EP Behave Yourself, the band went to Nashville to work on new material for their next album. Instead of writing and recording songs in a few days, they spent two months carefully working on the material. Lead singer Nathan Willett found this new experience to be "much more spread out, [it was] much more broken down and built up again."

The band found the approach different than the one used on their previous record, with Willett saying that, "[A] lot of our good ideas went unfinished. Nobody was there to tell us, "This is good, but it could be better." The album was produced by Jacquire King, who previously did albums for Kings of Leon, Modest Mouse and Tom Waits. Willett was surprised by King, commenting how he would interject himself into the recording process with advice and allow his artists to brainstorm ideas until they come up with the answer. The production featured reverb-tinged guitars and drum machines that were considered new to the band when they came across them during recording. Critics gave note to the production being reminiscent of bands like U2 and Coldplay, with Willett also alluding to some White Stripes influences as well.

== Music and lyrics ==
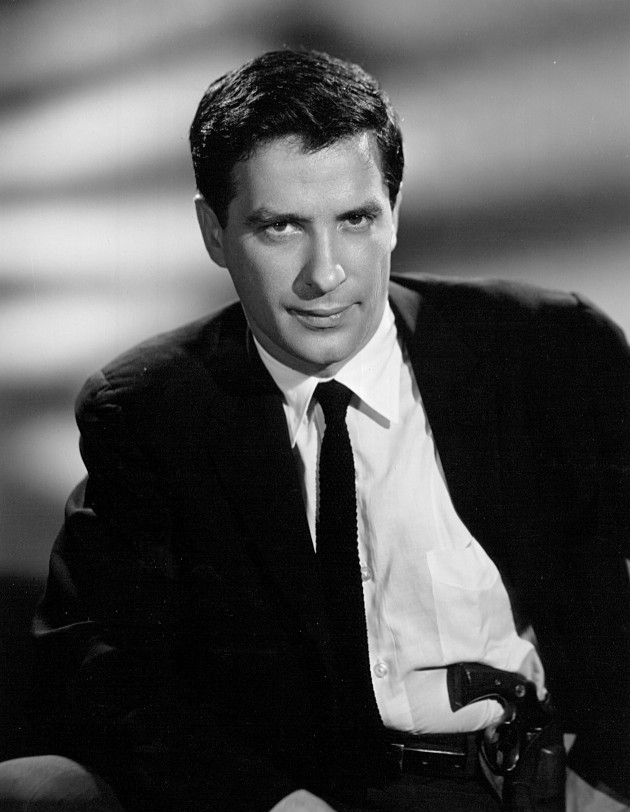
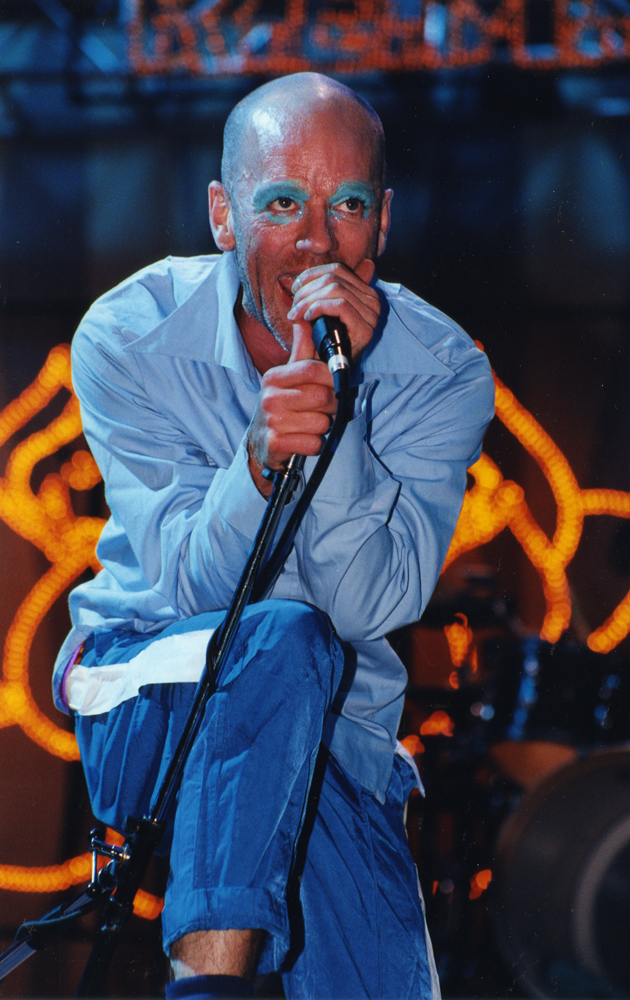
Nathan Willett said that the lyrical content for the album was inspired by artists like John Cassavetes (left) and Michael Stipe of R.E.M. (right).

The album's lyrical content and overall sound differ strongly from the band's previous albums. In an interview with Rolling Stone, Willett said that he went back to Long Beach after two years of touring to perfect his voice and write lyrics that came from his personal life. He also said that one of the influences that inspired him was Michael Stipe and R.E.M. saying their initial lyricism was "more or less kind of just good-sounding words, and then kind of moved into really revealing something about themselves — that was my goal." Aside from Stipe, other influences that Willett was inspired by were Woody Allen (Husbands and Wives), John Cassavetes (A Woman Under the Influence) and Jonathan Franzen (The Discomfort Zone).

Lyrically, Mine Is Yours uses a first-person narrative in its songs, whereas previous albums were more character-driven. Willett explained that Cassavetes' A Woman Under the Influence got him to write songs about men-women relationships. The opening title track was described by Willett as being more straightforward than the previous two albums and embodies the record's themes of relationships. The track begins with a minute-long intro that's inspired by U2's The Joshua Tree. Claire Suddath from Time described "Louder Than Ever" as a song that "isn't a breakup song so much as a we-need-to-talk anthem", and also gave note of "Royal Blue" being "a spirited, piano-and-guitar number about the redemptive quality of devotion." The overall sound of the track is reminiscent of funk. "Finally Begin" has drum work that's similar in style to Ringo Starr. "Out of the Wilderness" was described by Sputnikmusic's Rudy Klap as "a gently lilting ballad" that's backed up by drums and a combustible bridge that "coalesces into one of Willett's most fiery performances." It also utilizes guitar tones and a breakdown that's reminiscent of The Who.

"Skip the Charades" was based on the idea of relationships using charades and the theatricality of it all. "Sensitive Kid" is about a son dealing with the separation of his parents by throwing a party in his empty house and being admonished for it when told to act more like a grown up. Willett explained that in high school, he would have parties at his house because it was empty and that his mother was out dating other people. The overall sound of the track utilizes "fractured stabs of piano, electronic percussion, and obtuse grooves" reminiscent of Spoon. "Bulldozer" is about starting over from a failed relationship. Willett said that the inspiration for the song came from the marital problems that some of his college friends had gone through in their relationships, but with more of a happy ending from the aftermath of it all. "Cold Toes on the Cold Floor" was described by critics as a return to the band's debut record Robbers & Cowards, specifically the track "Hang Me Up to Dry". Willett called the track one of his favorites off the album because of its similarity to their previous efforts and its playability live that allow for a lot of improvisation.

== Singles ==
The lead single, "Louder Than Ever", was released digitally on December 14, 2010 (officially on January 24, 2011) and peaked at number 31 on the Alternative Songs chart, their fourth top 40 hit on that chart. A music video was created for it and premiered in January 2011. A second single, "Skip the Charades", was released on February 8, 2011, on SoundCloud, only making it on the Rock Digital Songs chart at number 43. A music video was created for the single and was released on iTunes on June 22, 2011.

The song "Finally Begin" was released as the album's first promotional single on March 7, 2011, and peaked at number 99 in the Netherlands. A music video, directed by drummer Matt Aveiro, was created for the song and it premiered on March 15, 2011. The song "Royal Blue" was released as the album's second promotional single, peaking at number 24 on the Mexico Ingles Airplay chart and number 94 in the Netherlands. The title track, although not released as a single, managed to reach number 23 on the Rock Digital Songs chart.

== Promotion ==
The band performed eight songs from the album at a Pioneertown concert on November 5, 2010. They followed that up with several talk show appearances to help promote the album; performing a medley of "Louder Than Ever" and "Royal Blue" on both Jimmy Kimmel Live! and Last Call with Carson Daly. They performed "Louder Than Ever" on the Late Show with David Letterman, gave a performance at Jack White's Third Man Records that was recorded and released in March 2011 and made festival appearances at Bonnaroo, Lollapalooza Chile and Coachella.

=== Tour ===
On November 30, the band performed a few UK tour dates to promote Mine Is Yours ahead of its release, beginning with Manchester Academy and finishing at London's KOKO club. On December 1, they went on a 24-city spring tour across North America to go along with both their UK and latter-half 2010 tour dates, beginning with Portland, Oregon's Crystal Ballroom and finishing at Oakland's Fox Theatre.

== Critical reception ==
Professional ratings
Aggregate scores
Source	Rating
Metacritic	55/100
Review scores
Source	Rating
AllMusic	3/5 stars
NME	3/10
Paste	5.0/10
The Phoenix	3/4 stars
Pitchfork	3.9/10
PopMatters	4/10 stars
Rolling Stone	2.5/5 stars
Slant Magazine	2/5 stars
Spin	5/10 stars
Sputnikmusic	3.5/5.0

Mine Is Yours received mixed reviews from music critics, who were divided by the band's sound and lyrical content. At Metacritic, which assigns a normalized rating out of 100 to reviews from mainstream critics, the album received an average score of 55, based on 21 reviews.

Ryan Reed of The Phoenix said "On Mine Is Yours, everything is bigger. King's reverb-tinged production puts the focus on the band's surprisingly tender melodies and slow-burn rock arrangements; the result is 11 melodic, economical tracks that deliver huge hooks without sacrificing instrumental dexterity." John Freeman of Clash found more enjoyment from the record than the "solid but oddly unsatisfying Loyalty to Loyalty," giving praise to Willett's songwriting for mining "fractured relationships for inspiration and the resultant openness," concluding that King's production of Willett's songs "has created the finest Cold War Kids album yet." Theo Krekis of Drowned in Sound was pleased by the band's new direction in sound without coming across as overly mainstream and removing their trademark piano-heavy tracks, saying they took the Arcade Fire's The Suburbs and added a slice of pop to it.

Rudy Klap of Sputnikmusic commented on the quality of both the songwriting and production, finding unevenness on both throughout the album, but still found it to be "a damn good rock record through and through [...] there's an accomplishment to be praised." He also said that the album will divide fans. Mikael Wood of the Los Angeles Times also commented on the divisive take the fans will have with the album, as well as its lack of uniqueness. AllMusic's Heather Phares noted the album's newfound polish and maturity differing from the band's previous releases. Josh Modell of Spin was critical of Nathan Willett's performance, divided by the tone he used throughout the album, and the songs overall saying "[A] couple of songs succeed on their own terms, but most float unmemorably down the highway of not-quite-modern rock."

In a negative review, Kevin Liedel of Slant Magazine considered the album to be a "crushing disappointment", calling it "a work of obviously borrowed ideas from a group highly capable of succeeding with their own." PopMatters contributor David Gassmann said that despite some strong hooks and instrumental choices, he felt the album lacked the idiosyncratic personality from the band's previous records and resembled more of The Script and Train due to King's production. He added that listeners will consider this as a gateway introduction to the band itself. Sean O'Neal of The A.V. Club gave the album a D+ grade. He found their sound to be "dulled for maximum accessibility" coupled with "uninspired melodies" and "formless" lyrics, calling it "the bland sound of a band trading identity for ambition." NME's Katherine Rodgers was very critical about the record, finding some of the tracks to be generic and found the highlights to be "asphyxiated in lubricious studio slime."

== Commercial performance ==
Mine Is Yours debuted at number 21 on the Billboard 200, their second album to appear in the top 50 and in the same position as their previous album, despite selling 4,000 fewer copies. It additionally charted in several territories but was less successful chart wise than Loyalty to Loyalty. The record debuted at number 9 in Australia (whereas Loyalty to Loyalty reached number 20) and stayed there for an additional four weeks. It debuted at numbers 56 and 85 in Austria and Switzerland respectively before leaving the next week; their only charting album in those countries to date. However, it did poorly in Belgium, France and the United Kingdom, charting at numbers 54, 128 and 84 respectively (whereas the previous album charted at numbers 29, 48 and 68).

== Track listing ==
All tracks are written by Nathan Willett.

No.	Title	Length
1.	"Mine Is Yours"	4:16
2.	"Louder Than Ever"	2:44
3.	"Royal Blue"	3:33
4.	"Finally Begin"	3:41
5.	"Out of the Wilderness"	4:07
6.	"Skip the Charades"	4:25
7.	"Sensitive Kid"	3:33
8.	"Bulldozer"	5:02
9.	"Broken Open"	4:39
10.	"Cold Toes on the Cold Floor"	4:06
11.	"Flying Upside Down"	4:18

Deluxe edition bonus tracks
No.	Title	Length
12.	"Don't Look Down on Me"	2:31
13.	"Fashionable"	7:02

iTunes bonus track (pre-order only)
No.	Title	Length
14.	"Goodnight Tennessee"	5:25

== Personnel ==
Adapted from the liner notes of Mine Is Yours.

Cold War Kids

- Nathan Willett – lead vocals, piano, rhythm guitar
- Jonathan Russell – lead guitar, keyboards, backing vocals
- Matthew Aveiro – drums, percussion
- Matthew Maust – bass guitar

Artwork

- Maust – design
- Lucy Hamblin – photography

Production

- Jacquire King – producer, recording, mixing
- Brad Bivens – additional recording engineer
- Morgan Stratton – assistant engineer
- Joe Martino – assistant engineer
- Adam Bednarik – assistant engineer
- Justin March – assistant engineer

== Charts ==
Chart (2011)	Peak position
Australian Albums (ARIA)	9
Austrian Albums (Ö3 Austria)	56
Belgian Albums (Ultratop Flanders)	54
French Albums (SNEP)	128
Scottish Albums (Official Charts)	96
Swiss Albums (Schweizer Hitparade)	85
UK Albums (Official Charts)	84
US Billboard 200	21
US Top Alternative Albums (Billboard)	5
US Digital Albums (Billboard)	7
US Top Rock Albums (Billboard)	5

== Release history ==
Region	Date	Format	Label	Ref.
France	January 24, 2011	Digital download, CD, Vinyl	Cooperative Music	
United Kingdom	January 24, 2011	Digital download, CD, Vinyl	V2	
United States	January 25, 2011	Digital download, CD, Vinyl	Downtown, Interscope	
Germany	November 21, 2011	Digital download, CD, Vinyl	Downtown, Cooperative Music	
