= Hold My Home =

Studio album by Cold War Kids
- Released: October 21, 2014
- Recorded: March – April 2014
- Studio: Port of Call Studio (San Pedro)
- Genres: Indie rock, indie pop
- Length: 39:32
- Label: Downtown
- Producers: Lars Stalfors and Dann Gallucci

Cold War Kids chronology
Tuxedos (2013)	Hold My Home (2014)	L.A. Divine (2017)

Singles from Hold My Home
- 1. "All This Could Be Yours" Released: July 15, 2014; 2. "First" Released: February 17, 2015

Hold My Home is the fifth studio album by American indie rock band Cold War Kids. It was released on October 21, 2014, under Downtown Records.

Following the mild reception of their fourth album Dear Miss Lonelyhearts and the departure of original drummer Matt Aveiro, the band enlisted former Modest Mouse percussionist Joe Plummer and started work on their next project. Hold My Home has spawned two singles: "All This Could Be Yours" and "First". The album was released to mixed reviews from music critics who argued over its production and songwriting. To promote the record, the band toured across North America.

== Background ==
After finishing their tour for their fourth album Dear Miss Lonelyhearts and digital-only EP Tuxedos, the band announced that a fifth record was in the works. On November 10, 2013, the Orange County Register reported that drummer Matt Aveiro had left the band, and that Modest Mouse drummer Joe Plummer would be holding his place indefinitely. It is unclear whether or not Aveiro's leave is permanent or temporary.

== Promotion ==
On October 21, the band announced a tour to support the project, beginning with Denver's Ogden Theatre on January 21, 2015 and finishing at Portland's Crystal Ballroom on October 15, 2016. On November 20, they performed "All This Could Be Yours" on the talk show Conan.

== Critical reception ==
Professional ratings
Aggregate scores
Source	Rating
Metacritic	55/100
Review scores
Source	Rating
AllMusic	4/5 stars
Clash	7/10
Consequence of Sound	D+
Drowned in Sound	7/10
Exclaim!	8/10
Paste	7.9/10
PopMatters	4/10 stars
Under the Radar	6/10 stars

Hold My Home received generally mixed reviews from music critics, who argued over its production and songwriting. At Metacritic, which assigns a normalized rating out of 100 to reviews from mainstream critics, the album received an average score of 55, based on seven reviews.

AllMusic's Heather Phares praised the production throughout the record, calling it the band's best work since Robbers & Cowards concluding that, "with 'Hold My Home', they emerge as a more straightforward band, and also a more confident and engaging one." Philip Cosores of Paste credited new members Gallucci and Plummer for raising the album's taste level over the previous two records and giving the band a whole new identity. Mackenzie Herd of Exclaim! also praised the new additions for their contributions to the various songs throughout the record, concluding that the band "have reinvigorated their sound with a new lineup, elbow grease and a knack for telling interesting stories in a unique voice."

Mat Smith of Clash praised the album for bringing back the dynamics and techniques heard in Robbers & Cowards only more disciplined, concluding that, "This far into their career, Cold War Kids should be thinking about a greatest hits - 'Hold My Home' is more or less that, given the staple reference points of the band that it covers, and yet it's all new and all the more vibrant for it." Haydon Spenceley of Drowned in Sound called the record "a mature, fully-realised piece of work," praising Willett's versatile vocals and the songs for expounding creativity through its instrumentals, saying that "In short, Cold War Kids are several bands at once. They have creativity in spades, yet somehow each fine-tuning, each iteration of their arsenal still sounds like 'them'."

Colin Fitzgerald of PopMatters was critical of the album's production and songwriting, finding the band trying too hard to emulate previous influences concluding that, "on 'Hold My Home', their attempt is a failure, featuring no virtuosity, no experimentation, no honesty, no power of any kind, just stodgy, empty confidence in place of anything worth saying." Colin Brennan of Consequence of Sound was also critical about the record, looking past the references and glimpses of merit in the songs to find the material by-the-numbers and lacking soul.

== Track listing ==
All tracks are written by Cold War Kids.

No.	Title	Length
1.	"All This Could Be Yours"	3:08
2.	"First"	3:20
3.	"Hot Coals"	3:28
4.	"Drive Desperate"	4:10
5.	"Hotel Anywhere"	3:11
6.	"Go Quietly"	3:51
7.	"Nights & Weekends"	2:55
8.	"Hold My Home"	2:50
9.	"Flower Drum Song"	3:37
10.	"Harold Bloom"	4:13
11.	"Hear My Baby Call"	4:49

== Personnel ==
Adapted from the liner notes of Hold My Home.

Cold War Kids

- Nathan Willett – lead vocals, piano, guitar
- Matt Maust – bass guitar
- Dann Gallucci – guitar, keyboards, percussion
- Joe Plummer – drums, percussion
- Matthew Schwartz – keyboards, guitar, backing vocals

Additional musicians

- Jessica Tonder – background vocals (for "Hear My Baby Call")

Artwork

- Maust – art and layout

Production

- Joe LaPorta – mastering
- Jack Becerra – mixing assistant

== Charts ==
Chart (2014)	Peak position
Australian Albums (ARIA)	61
US Billboard 200	56
US Top Alternative Albums (Billboard)	8
US Independent Albums (Billboard)	8
US Top Rock Albums (Billboard)	14

== Release history ==
Region	Date	Format	Label	Ref.
Australia	October 17, 2014	Digital download, CD, Vinyl	Downtown	
United States	October 21, 2014	Digital download, CD, Vinyl	Downtown	
France	October 27, 2014	Digital download, CD, Vinyl	Downtown	
Germany	March 6, 2015	Digital download, CD, Vinyl	Sony Music	
