= Behave Yourself (EP) =

EP by Cold War Kids
- Released: December 21, 2009
- Recorded: 2009
- Genres: Indie rock, soul
- Length: 14:37
- Labels: Downtown, V2
- Producer: Matt Wignall

Cold War Kids chronology
| Live from the Paradiso (2008) | Behave Yourself (2009) | Mine Is Yours (2011) |

Singles from Behave Yourself
- 1. "Audience" Released: December 1, 2009

Professional ratings
Aggregate scores
| Source | Rating |
|---|---|
| Metacritic | 66/100 |
Review scores
| Source | Rating |
| AbsolutePunk | (79%) |
| AllMusic | 3.5/5 stars |
| Prefix | 7.0/10.0 |
| Spin | 3/5 stars |

Behave Yourself is the seventh EP by the American indie rock band Cold War Kids. It was released on iTunes December 21, 2009, and the physical version was released on January 19, 2010.

The EP was announced on their official website on October 26, 2009. A 1-minute teaser trailer was uploaded to YouTube the same day. To promote the album, they played four shows in support of the release, with Flashy Python as a supporting act. The EP's artwork reads "These songs were recorded some time between "Loyalty" and now. They didn't belong there but kept hanging around, started trouble, made friends, and insisted they be heard". "Sermons" is a re-recording of the track "Sermons vs. the Gospel" that initially appeared on the With Our Wallets Full EP and as a hidden track at the end of their full-length debut Robbers & Cowards. The digital release debuted at number 177 on the Billboard 200.

== Track listing ==
| No. | Title | Length |
|---|---|---|
| 1. | "Audience" | 3:02 |
| 2. | "Coffee Spoon" | 3:54 |
| 3. | "Santa Ana Winds" | 2:31 |
| 4. | "Sermons vs. the Gospel" | 4:33 |
| 5. | "Baby Boy" | 0:37 |

== Personnel ==
- Nathan Willett – vocals, piano, guitar
- Matt Maust – bass guitar
- Jonnie Russell – guitar, piano, vocals
- Matt Aveiro – drums
