= Something Is Not Right with Me =

Single by Cold War Kids

from the album Loyalty to Loyalty
- B-side: "Bullies Always Win"
- Released: September 1, 2008 (iTunes)
- Recorded: 2008
- Genre: Indie rock, blues rock
- Length: 2:22
- Label: Downtown, V2
- Songwriter: Cold War Kids
- Producers: Kevin Augunas, Cold War Kids

Cold War Kids singles chronology
""Hang Me Up to Dry" (re-release)" (2007)	"Something Is Not Right with Me" (2008)	"I've Seen Enough" (2008)

Music video
- "Something Is Not Right with Me" on YouTube

"Something Is Not Right with Me" is a song by American indie rock band Cold War Kids. It serves as the fourth track and debut single off their second album Loyalty to Loyalty (2008). The song was released online in July 2008 by the band on their Myspace page. It was given an official release on September 1, 2008, on iTunes. Lyrically, it describes a person facing a dilemma about living in a world that's constantly changing.

"Something Is Not Right with Me" received a mixed response from critics. It peaked at number 39 on the Billboard Alternative Airplay chart and was voted number 38 in the Triple J Hottest 100 in 2008, their third song to appear on that chart since 2007's "Hang Me Up to Dry" and "Hospital Beds". A music video for the single was directed by Sophie Muller that features the band in an abandoned warehouse space.

== Song information ==
"Something Is Not Right with Me" was described by lead singer Nathan Willett as an upbeat track that's about a person losing touch with the revolving world and its constant changes from people to technology. James McMahon of NME described the song's rhythm as being "akin to Lodger-era Bowie."

== Critical reception ==
The song garnered mixed reviews from music critics. Joseph Coscarelli of Spin did a stream review and praised the band for its use of "a step-worthy, pounding bass line" and "Stones-styled bluesy licks". Judy Coleman of The Boston Globe found the song to be "infectiously manic". Despite finding milquetoast tracks on the album, The Guardian said that the song rose "above the general air of torpor". Chris Mincher of The A.V. Club was critical about the track, finding fault in Nathan Willett's voice going from "a mere Jack White-style wail to screechy barking" but overall found it to be "an otherwise fine tune".

The song was voted number 38 in the Triple J Hottest 100, 2008, their third song to appear on that chart since 2007's "Hang Me Up to Dry" and "Hospital Beds".

== Music video ==
The video features the band playing in an abandoned warehouse space in which they do random stuff that follows the song's title. The video was directed by Sophie Muller and was uploaded on the band's YouTube page on September 17, 2008.

== Live performances ==
Cold War Kids performed the song on Jimmy Kimmel Live! on September 19, 2008, The Tonight Show with Jay Leno on October 28, 2008, and The Late Late Show with Craig Ferguson on November 13, 2008.

== Use in popular culture ==
- The song was featured in the season 5 episode "Fire Sale" of the HBO series Entourage.
- The song was featured in the 2009 film Cirque du Freak: The Vampire's Assistant.

== Formats and track listing ==
Europe CD

1. "Something Is Not Right with Me" – 2:29

Europe 7" Vinyl

1. "Something Is Not Right with Me" – 2:22
2. "Bullies Always Win" – 3:11

== Charts ==
Chart (2008)	Peak position
US Alternative Airplay (Billboard)	39
