= Up in Rags/With Our Wallets Full =

Compilation album by Cold War Kids
- Released: February 2006
- Recorded: November 2005 – January 2006
- Genre: Indie rock
- Length: 47:16
- Label: Monarchy Music
- Producer: Jason Martin; Matt Wignall

Cold War Kids chronology
Up in Rags (2006)	Up in Rags/With Our Wallets Full (2006)	Robbers & Cowards (2006)

Up in Rags/With Our Wallets Full is a collection of early recordings by the American indie rock band Cold War Kids. After a surge of internet buzz and a heavy touring schedule in 2006, Cold War Kids packaged their previous two six-song EPs together as a full-length LP. The album consists of the same recordings on Up in Rags and With Our Wallets Full. The album was released on Monarchy Music as a promotional compilation LP of their very rare first two EPs (which were limited to 500 copies each).

== Track listing ==
=== A-side ===
1. "Hang Me Up to Dry" - 3:38
2. "Robbers" - 3:31
3. "We Used to Vacation" - 4:14
4. "Saint John" - 3:48
5. "Hospital Beds" - 4:46
6. "Pregnant" - 4:24

=== B-side ===
1. "Hair Down" - 3:41
2. "Red Wine, Success!" - 2:39
3. "Tell Me In The Morning" - 3:38
4. "Expensive Tastes" - 5:02
5. "Rubidoux" - 4:14
6. "Sermons vs The Gospel (demo)" - 3:41

== Credits ==
- Bass - Matt Maust
- Drums, Percussion - Matthew Aveiro
- Guitar, Piano, Vocals - Jonathan Bo Russell
- Vocals [Lead], Guitar, Piano - Nathan Willett
- Producer - Matt Wignall (Hang Me Up To Dry) and Jason Martin of Starflyer 59 fame (With Our Wallets Full)
