= Behave Yourself =

Behave Yourself may refer to:

- Behave Yourself!, a 1951 American film
- Behave Yourself! (TV series), a 2017 Australian comedy panel television series
- Behave Yourself (EP), a 2010 EP recording by the American rock band Cold War Kids
- "Behave Yourself," a song from the album Green Onions by Booker T and the M.G.'s
- Behave Yourself (horse) (1918–1937), an American Thoroughbred racehorse
