= Up in Rags =

EP by Cold War Kids
- Released: 2006
- Recorded: January 2006
- Genre: Indie rock, blues rock
- Length: 24:21
- Label: Monarchy Music

Cold War Kids chronology
With Our Wallets Full (2006)	Up in Rags (2006)	Up in Rags/With Our Wallets Full (2006)

Up in Rags is the third EP by the American indie rock band Cold War Kids. It was recorded in January 2006. The title of this EP is taken from the lyrics of "Hair Down" - "Man, we were still just babies / Dressing up in rags with our wallets full." In February 2006, Monarchy Music put together Up in Rags along with With Our Wallets Full as a full-length LP titled Up in Rags/With Our Wallets Full.

== Track listing ==
1. "Hang Me Up to Dry" - 3:38
2. "Robbers" - 3:31
3. "We Used to Vacation" - 4:14
4. "Saint John" - 3:48
5. "Hospital Beds" - 4:46
6. "Pregnant" - 4:24
