= Tuxedos (EP) =

EP by Cold War Kids
- Released: September 17, 2013 (iTunes)
- Recorded: 2013
- Genre: Indie rock
- Length: 19:59
- Label: Downtown

Cold War Kids chronology
Dear Miss Lonelyhearts (2013)	Tuxedos (2013)	Hold My Home (2014)

Tuxedos is the eighth EP by American indie rock band Cold War Kids. This was the follow-up to their fourth studio album Dear Miss Lonelyhearts and was released digitally on September 17, 2013, by Downtown Records. On August 15, Cold War Kids announced that they were going to follow up Dear Miss Lonelyhearts by releasing a six-track EP on digital only. Besides the title track, the EP features an alternate version of "Bottled Affection", covers of Antony and the Johnsons ("Aeon") and The Band ("You Don't Come Through") and two previously unreleased tracks in the US ("Romance Languages #2" and "Pine St.").

To promote both efforts, the band went on a 32-city US headlining tour with support act Papa, ending in early November. The band further promoted their EP by shooting a music video for the track "Pine St." and premiered it on their record label's YouTube page on November 13, 2013.

== Track listing ==
No.	Title	Length
1.	"Tuxedos"	4:09
2.	"Aeon"	3:38
3.	"Bottled Affection (Cathedral Version)"	2:54
4.	"Romance Languages #2"	2:52
5.	"Pine St."	2:17
6.	"You Don't Come Through"	4:19
