= 2011 Bonnaroo Music Festival =

The 2011 Bonnaroo Music Festival was held June 9–12, in Manchester, Tennessee and marked the 10th time the festival has been held since its inception in 2002. This year also marked the first return of the SuperJam since 2008.

== Deaths ==
Two festival-goers perished during the 2011 Bonnaroo Music Festival. Doctors and law enforcement officials believe the deaths to be drug/heat related. The death of 24-year-old Christopher Yoder of Raleigh, N.C marks the tenth death the festival has seen in the ten years since its inception.

== Line-up ==
=== Thursday, June 9 ===
(artists listed from earliest to latest set times)

- This Tent:
  - River City Extension
  - Wavves
  - The Knux
  - J. Cole
  - Twin Shadow
  - Childish Gambino
  - Dâm-Funk & Master Blazter
- That Tent:
  - Futurebirds
  - Freelance Whales
  - School of Seven Bells
  - Band of Skulls
  - The Walkmen
  - Deerhunter
- The Other Tent:
  - Hayes Carll
  - Karen Elson
  - Best Coast
  - The Drums
  - Sleigh Bells
  - Beats Antique
- The Comedy Theatre:
  - Lewis Black, Ted Alexandro, Eugene Mirman & Tim Minchin
  - Lewis Black, Kathleen Madigan, Tim Minchin & Hannibal Buress
  - Henry Rollins, Tig Notaro & Nate Bargatze
  - 420 Comedy Blaze hosted by Cheech Marin w/ Ralphie May, Jay Pharoah & the stars of Workaholics
- Cinema Tent:
  - Over the Top
  - The Naked Gun: From the Files of Police Squad!
  - The Last Mountain Film Intro and Q&A by Robert F. Kennedy, Jr. and Bill Haney
  - Poster Girl
  - Shampoo
  - 2011 NBA Finals Game 5
  - Kareem - On the Shoulders of Giants
  - Superjail from [adult swim]
  - Dark Side of the Moon / Wizard of Oz
  - Heavy Metal Parking Lot
  - The Last Detail
- The On Tap Lounge Brewed by Miller Lite:
  - Uncle Skeleton
  - Chris Harford and the Band of Changes
  - Greensky Bluegrass
  - Kopecky Family Band
  - MiniBoone
  - The Reverend Peyton's Big Damn Band
  - Civil Twilight
  - The David Mayfield Parade
  - The Band of Heathens
- Solar Stage:
  - Fresh Trix Breakdancing
  - Kopecky Family Band
  - Gypsy Hands Tribal Dance
  - He Is We
  - Bonnaroo Beard & Mustache Competition
  - Cory Chisel and The Wandering Sons
  - The Pimps of Joytime
  - African Drum & Dance
  - Fresh Trix Breakdancing
  - Gypsy Hands Tribal Dance
  - Miss Lolly Pop's Burlesque Coterie
- The Silent Disco:
  - DJ Neil Armstrong
  - Hesta Prynn
  - DJ Logic
  - Jared Dietch

=== Friday, June 10th ===
(artists listed from earliest to latest set times)

- What Stage:
  - Anthony B
  - Grace Potter and The Nocturnals
  - The Decemberists
  - My Morning Jacket
  - Arcade Fire
- Which Stage:
  - Sharon Van Etten
  - Béla Fleck and the Flecktones (the original lineup)
  - Warren Haynes Band
  - Ray Lamontagne
  - Primus
  - Lil Wayne
- This Tent:
  - Jessica Lea Mayfield
  - Phosphorescent
  - Matt & Kim
  - Atmosphere
  - Florence + the Machine
  - Bassnectar
  - Shpongle Presents Shpongletron Experience
- That Tent:
  - Graveyard
  - Kylesa
  - The Sword
  - Opeth
  - NOFX
  - The Black Angels
  - Pretty Lights
- The Other Tent:
  - Ben Sollee
  - Justin Townes Earle
  - Abigail Washburn
  - Wanda Jackson
  - The Del McCoury Band and the Preservation Hall Jazz Band
  - Big Boi
  - Ratatat
- The Comedy Theatre:
  - 420 Comedy Blaze hosted by Cheech Marin w/ Ralphie May, Jay Pharoah & the stars of Workaholics
  - Lewis Black, Kathleen Madigan, Tim Minchin & Hannibal Buress
  - Lewis Black, Ted Alexandro, Eugene Mirman & Tim Minchin
  - Henson Alternative's STUFFED AND UNSTRUNG
- Sonic Stage:
  - New Orleans Allstars
  - Hayes Carll
  - Jovanotti
  - Greensky Bluegrass
  - The Pimps of Joytime
  - Freelance Whales
  - Béla Fleck
  - Graveyard
  - Walk the Moon
- Cafe Where?:
  - Deas Vail
  - Walk the Moon
  - Hesta Prynn
  - He Is We
- Cinema Tent:
  - Connected: An Autobiography About Love, Death & Technology
  - Life in a Day
  - A Louisiana Fairytale Feat. Danny Clinch & Jim James and the Preservation Hall Jazz Band
  - SoLa: Louisiana Water Stories Benjamin Jaffe, Preservation Hall Jazz Band, Jon Bowermaster & more!
  - Aqua Unit Patrol Squad 1 / Squidbillies from [adult swim]
  - The League Intros: Jon LaJoie, Nick Kroll, Steve Rannazzisi & Paul Scheer
  - Bellflower
  - The Whole Bloody Affair
  - Long Live Lumet: Dog Day Afternoon
- The On Tap Lounge Brewed by Miller Lite:
  - Chancellor Warhol
  - The Pimps of Joytime
  - The Black Box Revelation
  - Kevin Hammond
  - Givers
  - Hanni El Khatib
  - Bobby Long
  - Cory Chisel and The Wandering Sons
  - JEFF the Brotherhood
  - The Uncalled For
- Solar Stage:
  - Secret Home Party
  - Gypsy Hands Tribal Dance
  - Rock The Earth Panel Discussion "Social Change Through Music"
  - African Drum and Dance by Mawre & Company
  - Rock The Earth Interview and Performance: Aunt Martha
  - Rock The Earth Interview & Performance: Greensky Bluegrass
  - Eco Fashion Show hosted by Art Institutes
  - Bonnaroo Beard & Mustache Competition
  - Civil Twilight
  - Futurebirds
  - Gypsy Hands Tribal Dance
  - Fresh Trix Breakdancing
  - Miss Lolly Pop's Burlesque Coterie
- The Silent Disco:
  - DJ Neil Armstrong
  - Jared Dietch
  - DJ Kraz
  - DJ Logic

=== Saturday, June 11th ===
(artists listed from earliest to latest set times)

- What Stage:
  - Dennis Coffey
  - Black Uhuru
  - Wiz Khalifa
  - The Black Keys
  - Eminem
- Which Stage:
  - Naomi Shelton & The Gospel Queens
  - Old Crow Medicine Show
  - Alison Krauss & Union Station featuring Jerry Douglas
  - Mumford & Sons
  - Buffalo Springfield feat. Richie Furay, Stephen Stills, Neil Young, Rick Rosas, Joe Vitale
  - String Cheese Incident
- This Tent:
  - Black Joe Lewis & the Honeybears
  - You Choose the Cover.... Leila Broussard vs. The Sheepdogs
  - Chiddy Bang
  - Man Man
  - !!!
  - Scissor Sisters
  - Girl Talk
- That Tent:
  - Alberta Cross
  - The Low Anthem
  - Deer Tick
  - Portugal. The Man
  - Loretta Lynn
  - Dr. John and The Original Meters and Allen Toussaint performing Desitively Bonnaroo
  - STS9
- The Other Tent:
  - Hanggai
  - Forro in the Dark
  - Jovanotti
  - Devotchka
  - Bootsy Collins & the Funk University
  - Omar Souleyman
  - Gogol Bordello
- The Comedy Theatre:
  - Henson Alternative's STUFFED AND UNSTRUNG
  - Donald Glover with Bill Bailey (2 Sets)
  - The League Live (Paul Scheer, Nick Kroll, Jon Lajoie, Stephen Rannazzisi)
- Sonic Stage:
  - Shahidah Omar
  - Abigail Washburn & The Village
  - Alberta Cross
  - Bobby Long
  - !!!
  - Bruce Hornsby
  - Amos Lee
  - Chris Harford and the Band of Changes
  - Civil Twilight
- Cafe Where?:
  - Kellee Maize
  - Infantree
  - Sallie Ford and the Sound Outside
  - J Roddy Walston and the Business
- Cinema Tent:
  - Harold and Maude
  - Garden State Q&A: Zach Braff
  - Special Screening: 30 Minutes or Less. Q&A: Aziz Ansari
  - Vanishing of the Bees Q&A: Director George Langworthy
  - Robot Chicken from [adult swim]
  - Saturday Night Fever
  - 8 Mile
  - New Jack City
  - Long Live Lumet: Serpico
- The On Tap Lounge Brewed by Miller Lite:
  - Cheer Up Charlie Daniels
  - Miss Willie Brown
  - Rotary Downs
  - Gary Clark Jr.
  - Lionize
  - Fences
  - Cristina Black
  - tristen
  - Matthew and the Atlas
  - Fine Peduncle
- Solar Stage:
  - Fresh Trix Breakdancing
  - Rock The Earth Panel Discussion "Social Change Through Music"
  - Rock The Earth Interview & Performance: Ben Sollee Trio
  - Rock the Earth: Abigail Washburn & Hanggai
  - Rock the Earth Interview & Performance: Rotary Downs
  - Bonnaroo Beard & Mustache Competition
  - Deas Vail
  - Andrea Belanger
  - The Beautiful Girls - Mat McHugh Solo & Acoustic
  - Fresh Trix Breakdancing
  - African Drum and Dance by Mawre & Company
  - Gypsy Hands Tribal Dance
  - Miss Lolly Pop's Burlesque Coterie
- The Silent Disco:
  - DJ Kraz
  - Gypsyphonic Disko ft. Ben Ellman
  - Motion Potion (San Francisco)

=== Sunday, June 12th ===
(artists listed from earliest to latest set times)

- What Stage:
  - Mavis Staples
  - Galactic
  - Robert Plant & Band of Joy
  - Widespread Panic
- Which Stage:
  - G. Love & Special Sauce
  - Amos Lee
  - Iron & Wine
  - The Strokes
- This Tent:
  - Smith Westerns
  - Neon Trees
  - Daniel Lanois' Black Dub
  - Cold War Kids
  - Explosions in the Sky
- That Tent:
  - Railroad Earth
  - Ryan Bingham
  - Bruce Hornsby & the Noisemakers
  - Gregg Allman
  - Superjam ft. Dan Auerbach and Dr. John
- The Other Tent:
  - The Head and the Heart
  - Nicole Atkins & the Black Sea
  - Junip
  - Robyn
  - Beirut
- The Comedy Theatre:
  - The League Live (Paul Scheer, Nick Kroll, Jon Lajoie, Stephen Rannazzisi)
  - John Waters, Tig Notaro & The Gregory Brothers (2 Sets)
- Sonic Stage:
  - Aunt Martha
  - Fences
  - Gypsyphonic Disko ft. Ben Ellman
  - G. Love
  - Railroad Earth
  - Nicole Atkins & the Black Sea
  - Ben Sollee
  - The White Buffalo
  - Jamie McLean Band
- Cafe Where?:
  - Andrea Belanger
  - Lauren Shera
  - Parkington Sisters
- Cinema Tent:
  - Ghostbusters
  - Portugal. The Man "Sleep Forever..."
  - Childrens Hospital from [adult swim]
  - 30 for 30 "Winning Time: Reggie Miller vs. The New York Knicks"
  - 2011 NBA Finals Game 6
- The On Tap Lounge Brewed by Miller Lite:
  - Jamie McLean Band
  - Shahidah Omar
  - Aunt Martha
  - The White Buffalo
  - The Beautiful Girls – Mat McHugh Solo & Acoustic
  - Aaron "Woody" Wood
  - The Apache Relay
- Solar Stage:
  - African Drum and Dance by Mawre & Company
  - Rock The Earth Panel Discussion "Social Change Through Music"
  - Secret Home Party
  - Rock the Earth Interview & Performance: Rotary Downs
  - Rock The Earth Interview & Performance: John Bell
  - Rock The Earth Interview & Performance
  - Bonnaroo Beard & Mustache Competition
  - Breakdancing
  - Gypsy Hands Tribal Dance
- The Silent Disco:
  - Motion Potion (San Francisco)
