= Aeon (song) =

Single by Antony and the Johnsons

from the album The Crying Light
- B-side: "Crazy in Love"
- Released: 3 August 2009
- Recorded: 2009
- Studio: Second Story and Looking Glass ("Aeon") and Legacy Studios NYC ("Crazy in Love")
- Genre: Chamber pop
- Length: 4:35
- Label: Secretly Canadian (US); Rough Trade (Europe/UK)
- Songwriter: Anohni Hegarty

Antony and the Johnsons singles chronology
"Epilepsy Is Dancing" (2009)	"Aeon" (2009)	"Thank You for Your Love" (2010)

"Aeon" is a single by American chamber pop band Antony and the Johnsons, originally released as part of their third studio album The Crying Light. It was released on August 3 (UK/Europe) and August 4 (US) on CD, digital and 7" vinyl as a double A-sided single.

The single features a cover of Beyoncé's 2003 chart topping hit "Crazy in Love", a song they had previously covered during their live shows. A video for the cover premiered on August 14, 2009 via Pitchfork.tv It was directed by Joie Iacono with footage of Pink Lady by James Elaine.

"Aeon" was performed on the Late Show with David Letterman on February 18, 2009. The song was covered by American indie rock band Cold War Kids for their eighth EP Tuxedos.

== Track listings ==
1. "Aeon" - 4:35
2. "Crazy in Love" (Beyoncé cover) - 4:47

== Personnel ==
- Mastered by Greg Calbi at Sterling Sound
- Mixed by - Bryce Goggin at Trout Recordings

"Aeon"

- Bass - Jeff Langston
- Composed and produced by - Antony Hegarty
- Flute - Brian Miller and Keith Bonner
- Guitar - Doug Wieselman
- Harp - Bridget Kibbey
- Piano, voice - Antony Hegarty
- Recorded by - Daniel Bora and Stewart Lerman
- Strings - Julia Kent, Maxim Moston and Rob Moose

"Crazy In Love"

- Arranged by - Antony Hegarty, Nico Muhly
- Cello - Julia Kent
- Composed by - Beyoncé Knowles, Eugene Record, Richard Harrison and Shawn Carter
- Contrabass - CJ Camerieri
- Harp - Jacqui Kerrod
- Oboe - Alexandra Knoll
- Piano - Nico Muhly
- Recorded by - Bryce Goggin
- Trumpet - CJ Camerieri
- Viola - Alissa Smith
- Violin - Cenovia Cummins and Maxim Moston
- Violin, mandolin and glockenspiel - Rob Moose
- Voice - Antony Hegarty
