= Live from the Paradiso =

EP by Cold War Kids
- Released: December 2, 2008
- Recorded: November 10, 2008 at Paradiso, Amsterdam
- Genre: Indie rock, blues rock
- Length: 16:42
- Label: Downtown Records

Cold War Kids chronology
Loyalty to Loyalty (2008)	Live from the Paradiso (2008)	Behave Yourself (2010)

Live from the Paradiso is a live EP by the American indie rock band Cold War Kids. The three tracks were taken from a live show at the Paradiso venue in Amsterdam on November 10, 2008. "A Change Is Gonna Come" is a Sam Cooke cover. The live EP was released on December 2, 2008.

== Track listing ==
1. "A Change Is Gonna Come" - 4:39 (Sam Cooke Cover)
2. "Saint John" – 4:07
3. "Quiet, Please!" - 7:56
