= Audience (Cold War Kids song) =

Single by Cold War Kids

from the album Behave Yourself
- Released: December 1, 2009
- Recorded: 2009 at Tackyland (Long Beach)
- Genre: Indie rock, blues rock
- Length: 3:02
- Label: Downtown
- Songwriter: Cold War Kids
- Producer: Matt Wignall

Cold War Kids singles chronology
"I've Seen Enough" (2008)	"Audience" (2009)	"Louder Than Ever" (2010)

Music video
- "Audience" on YouTube

"Audience" (often titled as "Audience of One") is a song by American indie rock band Cold War Kids. It was the sole single off their seventh EP Behave Yourself (2010). The song was made available as a free download by the band in November 2009 before being officially released on December 1, 2009.

"Audience" had a great response from critics who saw it as a return to form for the band. The song peaked at number 39 on the Billboard Alternative Airplay chart, their third top 40 hit on that chart. A music video was made for the single and premiered in January 2010.

== Critical reception ==
"Audience" was given a great reception from critics. Heather Phares of AllMusic praised the song, saying that it brought the band's sound and Willett's voice "closer to the Jeff Buckley-tinged side of their music than their feisty rock". Dave Park of Prefix also praised the song, saying that he found "a latently bittersweet quality to it that adds an extra layer of humanity and relativity to the affair".

== Music video ==
Directed by Vern Moen, the video takes places on a sailboat where the band members play one-half of a couple going through their morning at sea, while subtitles show what each other is saying. Intercut are scenes of the band performing in a house and when each of them are seen underwater. The video was uploaded on the band's YouTube page on January 25, 2010.

== Charts ==
Chart (2010)	Peak position
Canada Rock (Billboard)	37
US Alternative Airplay (Billboard)	39
