= Wildcat! Wildcat! =

American synth-pop band

Wildcat! Wildcat! is an American synthpop band from Los Angeles.

== History ==
Wildcat! Wildcat! was formed in 2012 by Jesse Taylor, Michael Wilson, and Jesse Carmichael, and in December of that year they opened for Alt-J on that band's Western U.S. tour dates. The group released several 45 rpm singles in 2012 and 2013, and issued EPs on Neon Gold Records and Downtown Records. They played South by Southwest in 2013 and appeared in a documentary, Hello Everywhere, directed by Sam Jones. A full-length album, No Moon at All, was released in August 2014, and reached #36 on the Billboard Heatseekers chart.

== Members ==
- Jesse Taylor - vocals, bass
- Michael Wilson - vocals, keyboard
- Jesse Carmichael - vocals, percussion

== Discography ==
- Wildcat! Wildcat! EP (Downtown Records, 2013)
- No Moon at All (Downtown Records, 2014)
