= Louder Than Ever =

Single by Cold War Kids

from the album Mine Is Yours
- Released: December 14, 2010 (ITunes); January 24, 2011
- Recorded: 2010
- Genre: Indie rock
- Length: 2:44
- Label: Downtown, Interscope, V2
- Songwriter: Nathan Willett
- Producers: Jacquire King; Cold War Kids

Cold War Kids singles chronology
"Audience" (2009)	"Louder Than Ever" (2010)	"Skip the Charades" (2011)

Music video
- "Louder Than Ever" on YouTube

"Louder Than Ever" is a song by American indie rock band Cold War Kids. The song was written by lead singer Nathan Willett. It's the second track off their third album Mine Is Yours (2011) and was released digitally as the debut single on December 14, 2010. It was officially released on January 24, 2011.

The song did decently in the US, peaking at numbers 31 and 48 on the Billboard Alternative Airplay and Hot Rock & Alternative Songs charts respectively. A music video for the single was made and premiered in January 2011.

== Chart performance ==
"Louder Than Ever" debuted on the Billboard Alternative Songs chart at number 37 and peaked at number 31, their fourth top 40 hit on that chart. It stayed on that chart for twelve weeks. It made its first appearance on the Billboard Hot Rock Songs chart at number 48 but fell off two weeks after.

== Music video ==
Directed by Vern Moen (who previously directed their video for "Audience"), the video tells a story about a model who's forced to change her appearance in order to appease the people handling her. The video was uploaded on the YouTube page of their record label's affiliate Fontana North on January 19, 2011.

== Live performances ==
Cold War Kids first performed "Louder Than Ever" along with "Royal Blue" on Jimmy Kimmel Live! on January 26, 2011. They performed the song again on the Late Show with David Letterman on March 14, 2011 and on Last Call with Carson Daly on November 1, 2011.

== Charts ==
Chart (2011)	Peak position
Belgium (Ultratop 50 Flanders)	81
US Alternative Airplay (Billboard)	31
US Hot Rock & Alternative Songs (Billboard)	48
