= First (Cold War Kids song) =

Single by Cold War Kids

from the album Hold My Home
- Released: February 17, 2015
- Genre: Indie rock
- Length: 3:20
- Label: Downtown, V2
- Songwriter: Cold War Kids
- Producers: Lars Stalfors; Dann Gallucci

Cold War Kids singles chronology
| "All This Could Be Yours" (2014) | "First" (2015) | "Love Is Mystical" (2017) |

Music video
- "First" on YouTube

"First" is a song by American indie rock band Cold War Kids. The song was written by the band and produced by Lars Stalfors and Dann Gallucci. It was the second and final single from their fifth album Hold My Home (2014) and was released on February 17, 2015. The song garnered a positive reception from music critics.

"First" peaked at number one on the Billboard Alternative Songs chart, becoming the band's highest charting single. A music video was made for the single and was released on January 12, 2015. The song was certified Platinum by the RIAA for selling over 1,000,000 digital copies in the United States.

== Critical reception ==
"First" received positive reviews from music critics. Philip Cosores of Paste called it a "clap-along anthem" and put it together with "All This Could Be Yours" and "Hot Coals" as "the strongest run the band has put together in its career." Heather Phares of AllMusic remarked the song being a highlight of the album due to its "anthemic power."

== Music video ==
The music video was uploaded on the band's Vevo page on January 12, 2015.

== Chart performance ==
The song spent seven weeks at number one on the Billboard Alternative Songs chart. It remains the band's only song to top that chart. The song stayed on the chart for 64 weeks, the fourth-longest run in the chart's history. In late 2023, for the 35th anniversary of the chart, Billboard ranked "First" at number 10 on its list of the top 100 alternative hits of all time.

== In popular culture ==
The song was used in a series of commercials for Hyundai promoting its 2019 lineup of electric and hybrid vehicles.

== Charts ==
=== Weekly charts ===
Weekly chart performance for "First"
| Chart (2015) | Peak position |
|---|---|
| Australia (ARIA) | 38 |
| Canada Hot 100 (Billboard) | 72 |
| Canada Rock (Billboard) | 5 |
| US Bubbling Under Hot 100 (Billboard) | 5 |
| US Adult Pop Airplay (Billboard) | 23 |
| US Hot Rock & Alternative Songs (Billboard) | 8 |
| US Rock & Alternative Airplay (Billboard) | 1 |

=== Year-end charts ===
2015 year-end chart performance for "First"
| Chart (2015) | Position |
|---|---|
| US Hot Rock Songs (Billboard) | 19 |
| US Rock Airplay (Billboard) | 6 |

2016 year-end chart performance for "First"
| Chart (2016) | Position |
|---|---|
| US Rock Airplay (Billboard) | 2 |

== Certifications ==
Certifications and sales for "First"
| Region | Certification | Certified units/sales |
|---|---|---|
| Australia (ARIA) | Gold | 35,000^{‡} |
| Brazil (Pro-Música Brasil) | Gold | 30,000^{‡} |
| Canada (Music Canada) | Gold | 40,000^{*} |
| New Zealand (RMNZ) | Platinum | 30,000^{‡} |
| United States (RIAA) | Platinum | 1,000,000^{‡} |
^{*} Sales figures based on certification alone.^{‡} Sales+streaming figures based on certification alone.

== See also ==
- List of number-one Billboard Alternative Songs of 2015
