= Mulberry Street (EP) =

EP by Cold War Kids
- Released: June 15, 2005
- Recorded: April 2005
- Genre: Indie rock
- Length: 23:11
- Label: Monarchy Music
- Producer: Matt Wignall

Cold War Kids chronology
Mulberry Street (2005)	With Our Wallets Full (2006)

Mulberry Street is the debut EP by the American indie rock band Cold War Kids. It was released in 2005 by Monarchy Music. The name of the EP refers to an Italian restaurant, Mulberry St. Ristorante, located in downtown Fullerton, above which guitarist/vocalist Jonnie Russell's apartment was situated.

== Track listing ==
1. "The Soloist in the Living Room" - 2:09
2. "Heavy Boots" - 4:13
3. "Quiet, Please!" - 4:50
4. "The Wedding" - 4:29
5. "In Harmony in Silver" - 3:24
6. "Don't Let Your Love Grow Away (from me)" - 4:06
