= Sammi Sanchez =

American Latin pop singer (born 1998)

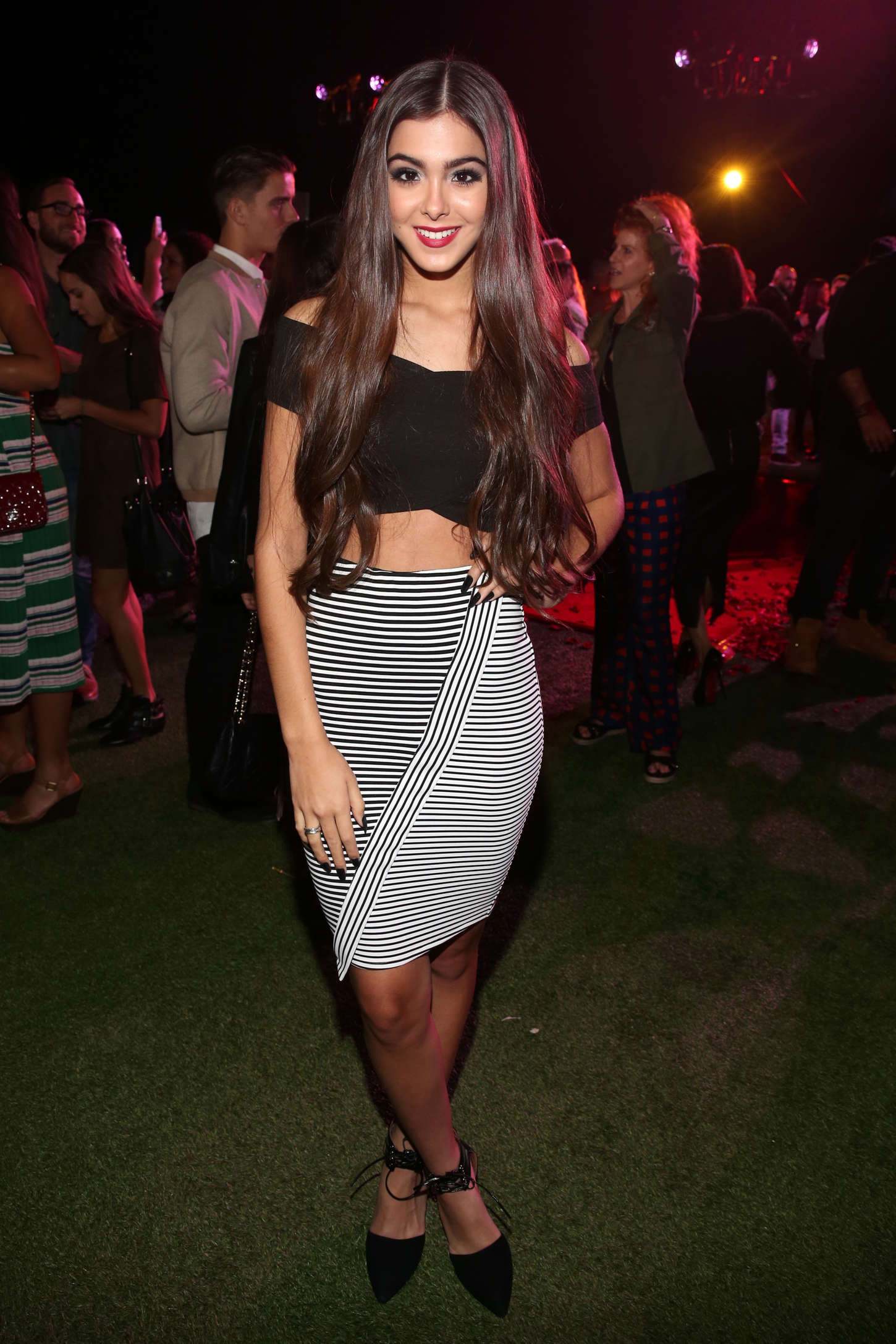
- Sammi at Latina Hot List Party in 2015

Background information
- Born: Samanta Carissa Sanchez; January 28, 1998 (age 27); San Diego, California, U.S.
- Genres: Pop; Latin pop
- Occupations: Singer, Actress
- Labels: Downtown Records
- Website: sammisanchez.com

Samantha Clarissa "Sammi" Sanchez (born January 28, 1998) is an American Latin pop singer.

== Early life ==
Sanchez was born in San Diego, California, the daughter of Mexican-Americans Lissa and Carlos Sanchez. She has a younger sister, Alecssa Sanchez. At the age of 11, Sanchez's family moved from Las Vegas, Nevada to New York City, New York. She attended Professional Performing Arts School in Manhattan.

== Career ==
On May 4, 2015, Sanchez released her single "Talk", which she co-wrote with Matthew Tishler and Maria Christensen.

== Discography ==
=== Singles ===
Year	Single	Album
2013	"Butterflies"	Non-album single
2013	"Butterflies (Spanglish Mix)"	Non-album single
2014	"Butterflies (Remix)"	Non-album single
2014	"Butterflies (Jason Nevins Mix)"	Non-album single
2014	"A Boy Like That"	Non-album single
2014	"I Saw Mommy Kissing Santa Claus"	Non-album single
2015	"Talk"	Non-album single
2015	"Bad Habit"	Non-album single
2016	"Girls Talk"	Non-album single
2016	"Girls Talk (Latin Remix)"	Non-album single
2017	"Deeper"	Non-album single
2017	"Hombre"	
2018	"Pum Pum (feat. Reykon)"	
2018	"Down Girl (feat. Alex Aiono)"	

== Touring ==
=== Opening Act ===
- Matt Hunter - Chile (2013)
- Megan Nicole - Sweet Dreams Tour(2015)

=== Headlining ===
- Tuckahoe Music Festival (2015)

== External ==
- Official website
