= Dear Miss Lonelyhearts =

Studio album by Cold War Kids
- Released: April 2, 2013
- Recorded: September–November 2012 in San Pedro, California
- Genre: Indie rock
- Length: 36:40
- Labels: Downtown, Mercury, V2
- Producers: Lars Stalfors and Dann Gallucci

Cold War Kids chronology
Mine Is Yours (2011)	Dear Miss Lonelyhearts (2013)	Tuxedos (2013)

Singles from Dear Miss Lonelyhearts
- 1. "Miracle Mile" Released: February 5, 2013

Dear Miss Lonelyhearts is the fourth studio album by American indie rock band Cold War Kids. The album was released on April 2, 2013, through Downtown Records.

Following the mixed reception of 2011's Mine Is Yours and the departure of original guitarist Jonnie Russell, the band recruited former Modest Mouse guitarist Dann Gallucci to take Russell's place and also co-produce the album with Lars Stalfors. The band spent three months in their San Pedro home studio to work on the album. The album's title takes its inspiration from Nathanael West's 1933 novel Miss Lonelyhearts.

The album received a mildly positive reception from critics who saw it as a return to form for the band after their previous album. Dear Miss Lonelyhearts debuted at number 51 on the Billboard 200 and spawned only one single: "Miracle Mile".

== Background ==
In February 2012, prior to recording, the band's original guitarist Jonnie Russell left the group, leading the band to recruit former Modest Mouse guitarist Dann Gallucci. Gallucci co-produced the record with Lars Stalfors, noted for his production work with Matt & Kim and Funeral Party. Gallucci strived for "spacious, audacious sounds" instead of the band's usual "grit-rock." The record was recorded at the group's home studio in San Pedro, and experimented by adding drum machines. Dear Miss Lonelyhearts takes inspiration from Nathanael West's 1933 novel Miss Lonelyhearts, which revolves around an advice columnist who has a crisis about his readers suffering. "The struggle of his character worked their way into many of the songs," said vocalist Nathan Willett. The record features more electronic compositions, influenced in part by groups New Order and Depeche Mode. The album cover was designed by bassist Matt Maust, who designs every Cold War Kids release. The typography uses Bodoni, a typeface commonly used by pop stars such as Beyoncé, Lady Gaga and Mariah Carey.

The band released trailers, detailing the making of the record, each week prior to its release.

== Critical reception ==
Professional ratings
Aggregate scores
Source	Rating
Metacritic	66/100
Review scores
Source	Rating
AllMusic	3.5/5 stars
Alternative Press	(favorable)
Associated Press	(mixed)
The Boston Globe	(favorable)
Consequence of Sound	C−
NME	(7/10)
Paste	(7.1/10.0)
Q	(mixed)
Rolling Stone	2/5 stars
Uncut	(mixed)

Dear Miss Lonelyhearts received positive reviews from music critics, who considered it an improvement following Mine Is Yours, which received a more mixed reaction. At Metacritic, which assigns a normalised rating out of 100 to reviews from mainstream critics, the album received an average score of 66, based on 16 reviews.

Alternative Press wrote that "After the wet noodle that was 2011's Mine Is Yours, California indie purveyors Cold War Kids come back al dente on Dear Miss Lonelyhearts." Heather Phares of AllMusic felt the record played to the group's strengths: "Dear Miss Lonelyhearts is more about what the band does best rather than breaking new ground, and the result is some of Cold War Kids' most promising and satisfying music since their debut." Sarah Rodman of The Boston Globe was similarly positive regarding the varied musical direction: "[the] band [goes] in several different directions at once and [...] make that philosophy work for a good chunk of an album." Kevin Perry of NME found the record a return to form for the band, following Mine Is Yours: "They've stopped trying to do indie rock by numbers and gone back to the sort of idiosyncratic weirdness that made us fall for them in the first place." British music magazine Q wrote that "At only 37 minutes long, it never outstays its welcome."

More mixed reviews came from Paste's Philip Cosores, who felt that while the band achieved new relevance, it still covered predictable territory: "[The album] is hampered by innocuous words and the lack of personality in the arrangements." James H. Collins of the Associated Press felt the record was uneven, writing, "When the arrangements become crowded, instead of adding color or ornamentation, the songs get weighed down and are less interesting." Jon Dolan of Rolling Stone opined that "All the literary ambitions and drama-rock gestures fall in a ponderous heap – like CWK are losing an arms race with their own pretensions." Uncut wrote that "Four albums in, and Cold War Kids still feel like a band trying to decide what they are."

== Track listing ==
All lyrics are written by Nathan Willett; all music is composed by Cold War Kids.

No.	Title	Length
1.	"Miracle Mile"	3:00
2.	"Lost That Easy"	3:24
3.	"Loner Phase"	3:06
4.	"Fear & Trembling"	4:42
5.	"Tuxedos"	4:10
6.	"Bottled Affection"	2:44
7.	"Jailbirds"	2:43
8.	"Water & Power"	3:12
9.	"Dear Miss Lonelyhearts"	4:34
10.	"Bitter Poem"	5:05

== Charts ==
Chart (2013)	Peak position
Australian Albums (ARIA)	48
Belgian Albums (Ultratop Flanders)	96
Belgian Albums (Ultratop Wallonia)	142
UK Albums Chart	149
US Billboard 200	52
US Top Alternative Albums (Billboard)	11
US Independent Albums (Billboard)	31

== Release history ==
Region	Date	Format	Label	Ref.
Australia	January 1, 2013	Digital download, CD, Vinyl	Downtown	
United Kingdom	January 1, 2013	Digital download, CD, Vinyl	Downtown	
United States	April 2, 2013	Digital download, CD, Vinyl	Downtown	
Germany	April 5, 2013	Digital download, CD, Vinyl	Downtown	
France	April 8, 2013	Digital download, CD, Vinyl	Downtown	
