= With Our Wallets Full =

EP by Cold War Kids
- Released: 2006
- Recorded: November 2005
- Genre: Indie rock, blues rock
- Length: 22:55
- Label: Monarchy Music

Cold War Kids chronology
Mulberry Street (2005)	With Our Wallets Full (2006)	Up in Rags (2006)

With Our Wallets Full is the second EP by the American indie rock band Cold War Kids. It was recorded in November 2005. The title of this EP is taken from the lyrics of "Hair Down" - "Man, we were still just babies / Dressing up in rags with our wallets full." In February 2006, With Our Wallets Full and Up in Rags were released together by Monarchy Music as a full-length LP titled Up in Rags/With Our Wallets Full.

== Track listing ==
1. "Hair Down" - 3:41
2. "Red Wine, Success!" - 2:39
3. "Tell Me In The Morning" - 3:38
4. "Expensive Tastes" - 5:02
5. "Rubidoux" - 4:14
6. "Sermons vs The Gospel (demo)" - 3:41
