= Loyalty to Loyalty =

Studio album by Cold War Kids
- Released: September 23, 2008
- Recorded: March – June 2008
- Studio: Fairfax Recordings (North Hollywood); Ocean Way Studios (Hollywood); Sound City Studios (Los Angeles); Schnee Studio (North Hollywood); Tackyland (Long Beach)
- Genre: Indie rock; blues rock
- Length: 48:59
- Label: Downtown; V2
- Producer: Kevin Augunas; Cold War Kids

Cold War Kids chronology
We Used to Vacation (2006)	Loyalty to Loyalty (2008)	Live from the Paradiso (2008)

Singles from Loyalty to Loyalty
- 1. "Something Is Not Right with Me" Released: September 1, 2008; 2. "I've Seen Enough" Released: October 22, 2008

Loyalty to Loyalty is the second studio album by American indie rock band Cold War Kids. It was released on September 23, 2008, by Downtown Records.

Following the success of their debut album Robbers & Cowards and spending the rest of 2007 touring across North America and Europe, the band started recording new material for their next album over the course of four months. Taking its title from the paper of the same name by American philosopher Josiah Royce, Loyalty to Loyalty carries a darker tone than its previous album by having a more experimental sound throughout and songs that deal with philosophies and politics, including suicide, crisis of faith, public security and job satisfaction.

The album received a generally positive reception but critics said it was uneven in terms of songwriting and performance. Loyalty to Loyalty debuted at number 21 on the Billboard 200 and spawned two singles: "Something Is Not Right with Me" and "I've Seen Enough", the former was voted number 38 in the Triple J Hottest 100 in 2008. To promote the album, the band toured across North America, Europe and Australia with appearances at music festivals and talk shows.

== Background ==
Cold War Kids released their debut album Robbers & Cowards on October 11, 2006. The album garnered a largely positive reception from critics, but Marc Hogan of Pitchfork criticized the band for its songwriting, melodies and Christian symbolism, saying that "Robbers and Cowards insults our intelligence a few times too often." Cat Dirt Sez of the San Diego CityBeat said that Hogan's review was an example of lazy journalism, with lead guitarist Jonnie Russell saying that the reviewer wanted a wittier approach to the album rather than a thoughtful assessment of it. To promote the album, the band spent most of 2007 touring across North America and Europe through appearances at music festivals and talk shows. Bassist Matt Maust said that touring exhausted the band and that they were eager to return to the studio to write new material for their next album.

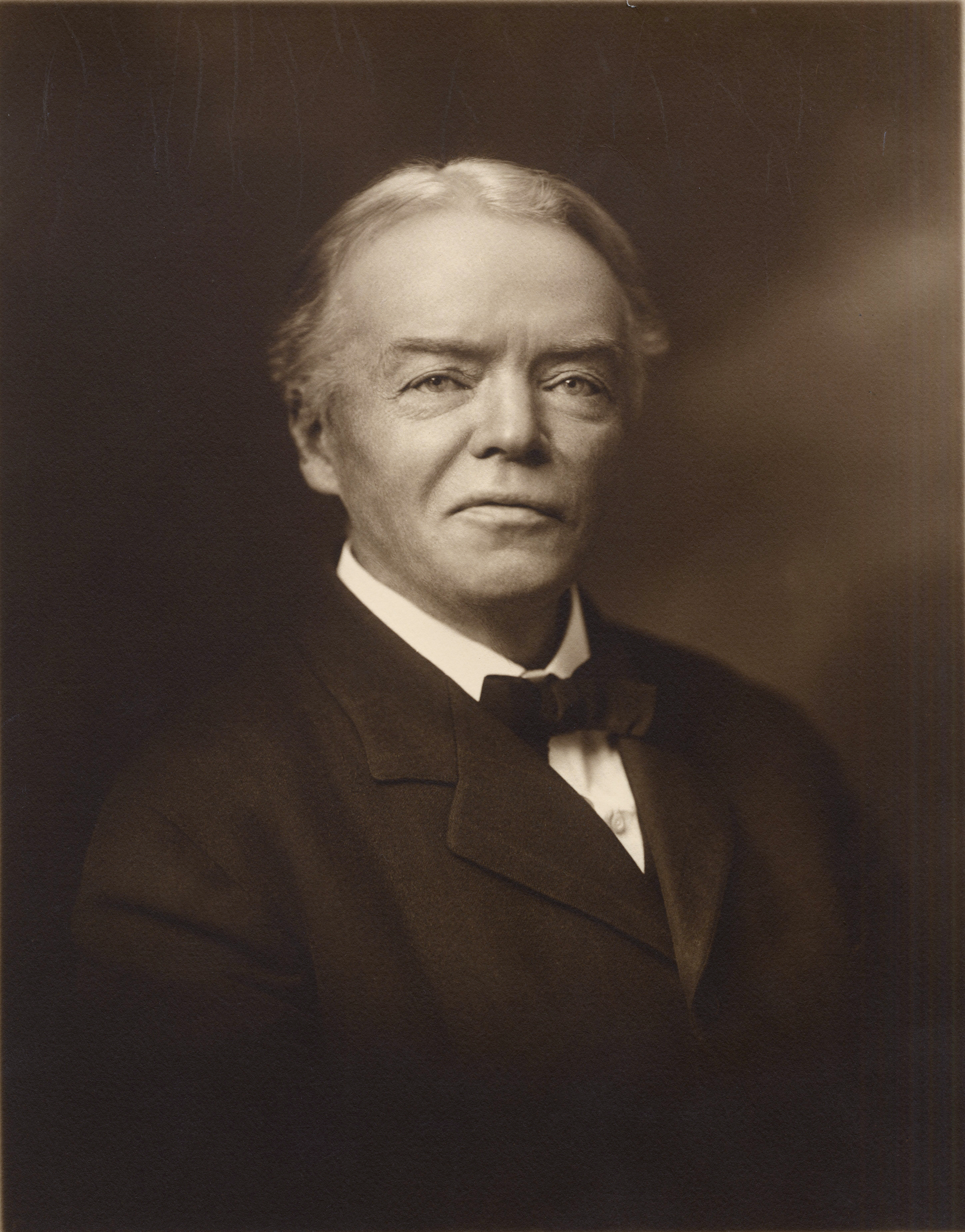
The album's title comes from the paper of the same name by American philosopher Josiah Royce.

Loyalty to Loyalty's title comes from a paper of the same name by American philosopher Josiah Royce, in which he challenged Friedrich Nietzsche's ideas about "will to power" and the übermensch, "saying that the ultimate pursuit of mankind should be to live in community and embrace each other, not to try to trample each other and rise to the top." Maust said that he could relate to that phrase with the band saying that it's "very similar to how [we] conduct ourselves, the way that [we] write songs and the way that [we] view each other in the band. No one person is writing for the other person, but we are loyal to each other. We're loyal to loyalty." For the recording process, Maust explained that they took four months to experiment with deeper and grittier sounds they were comfortable with, compared to the first record that took eight days to create that carried "a much more polished, for-radio sound." He also commented that the overall dark tone throughout the album was the cause of constant touring across Europe, but said that it did more good than harm for the band because it led to them crafting songs that weren't written from the perspective of being on the road.

== Music and lyrics ==
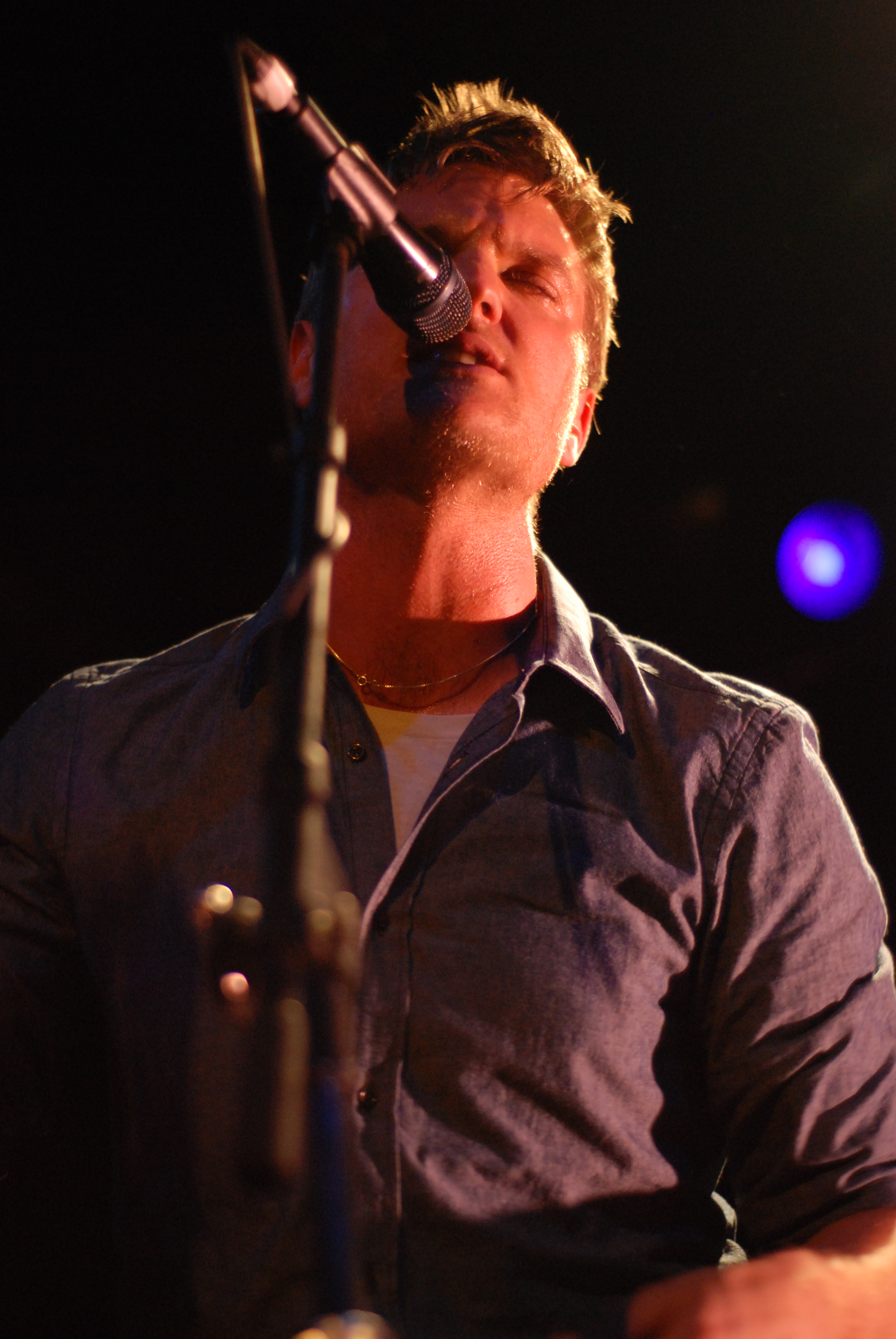
Lead singer Nathan Willett filled the album with songs that told topical stories with characters that were people from today.

For the techniques used to craft the overall sound of the album, August Brown of the Los Angeles Times described the band foregoing the use of full chords and verse-chorus-verse structures in favor of "distant guitar effects, crunchy bass grooves and smatterings of percussion." Regarding the songs from the album, Maust said that lead singer Nathan Willett's lyrics were a mixture of folk tales and topical stories, stating that "a lot of people say the last record was more about yesteryear. This [new record] has some of that, but it's much more today. The characters are people from today." The thirteen tracks off the album deal with a variety of philosophies and politics that range from contemplating suicide, crisis of faith, alienation, anonymity, public security and job satisfaction.

Opening track "Against Privacy" was described by Willett as a "bohemian manifesto" made by a person with an affinity for the arts and wanting to live on an art commune. "Mexican Dogs" was written by the band during a trip in Mexico City where they saw a pack of unnamed three-legged dogs running wild across the field. Maust said that he saw it as a metaphor for how the band operates as a whole, in their conduction of both art and business, and how their song craft is "very community oriented and very democratic." The overall sound of the track is reminiscent of boogie rock. The track "Every Valley Is Not a Lake" was a song that was left off Robbers & Cowards. It tells the story about a mother lecturing her daughter about going wild in the world and the consequences she may face if not careful. The song utilizes jazz piano for its melodies. "Something Is Not Right with Me" is an upbeat track about a person losing touch with the revolving world and its constant changes from people to technology. Critics described the song as having "Stones-styled bluesy licks" and "Lodger-era Bowie rhythms."

"Welcome to the Occupation" is about a teacher limited with his career who strives to be an artist. Willett was inspired by his job as an English high school teacher in Torrance to write the song, saying that it didn't give him "a lot of creative space to really be very inspired to be a teacher." "Golden Gate Jumpers" is about a woman who goes to the Golden Gate Bridge and contemplates taking her life away. The tracks "Avalanche in B" and "I've Seen Enough" were originally conceived by the band as one-long track but instead cut into two songs. The former uses snow as a metaphor for how bleak and empty life is when it is coming straight towards you. The latter was created during a jam session in which the band played one continuous chord progression that stuck with them throughout the session. "Every Man I Fall For" is about a woman's perspective on relationships. Inspired by his own mother's relationship with men, Willett saw something he could craft from that emotion, saying that it stuck with him as having importance "because it was something I always saw in relationships; like my mom being a single mother and seeing how men treat these women and how they operate in relationships."

"Dreams Old Men Dream" was inspired by the Ingmar Bergman film Wild Strawberries and Fyodor Dostoyevsky's short story The Dream of a Ridiculous Man. It tells the story of an elderly man reflecting back on the life he had and what he wished he had done before. "On the Night My Love Broke Through" was the last song made for the album that was recorded live. It was inspired by the works of German-American poet Charles Bukowski. "Relief" is written from the perspective of a person that questions God's way of controlling the Earth and handling its inhabitants. God himself answers the person's question when Willett sings, "Flash flood, you got too comfortable, so I showed you, who's really in control." The overall sound of the track is described as electronica in the vein of "mid-era Radiohead." The album closer, "Cryptomnesia", was inspired by a case involving Russian-American novelist Vladimir Nabokov being accused of plagiarism involving his 1955 novel Lolita. Willett said that it is "an apt word for the way history seeps into his songwriting today."

== Singles and promotion ==
The band released a one-minute long "teaser" for the album on their YouTube page on June 25, 2008. The album's lead single, "Something Is Not Right with Me", first appeared on the Cold War Kids Myspace page in July 2008 and was given an official release on September 1, 2008, through iTunes. It debuted and peaked at number 39 on the Billboard Alternative Songs chart; their second top 40 hit on that chart. A music video directed by Sophie Muller was created for the single and premiered on the band's YouTube page on September 17, 2008. The song was voted number 38 in the Triple J Hottest 100, 2008. A second single, "I've Seen Enough", was released on October 22, 2008, but failed to chart. Two music videos were created to promote the single. The first video was directed by Vern Moen and shot in black-and-white, premiering on the band's YouTube page on February 23, 2009. The second video was a collaboration with director Sam Jones (who had previously directed I Am Trying to Break Your Heart: A Film About Wilco) and his production company Tool of North America. The video was interactive and involved each band member playing his instrument solo on a dark stage, with the viewers given free rein to choose which instruments were played and to make their own mixes of the song. The video was nominated in the 'Online Film & Video' category for Best Use of Interactive Video at the 2010 Webby Awards and won the People's Voice Award.

On July 25, the band announced a 55-city nationwide tour to promote Loyalty to Loyalty ahead of its release, beginning with Byron Bay's Splendour in the Grass festival and finishing at Paris' Bataclan. The tour was marked with several festival appearances at Belladrum and Outside Lands. During that tour, they made television appearances on Jimmy Kimmel Live!, The Tonight Show with Jay Leno and The Late Late Show with Craig Ferguson.

== Critical reception ==
Professional ratings
Aggregate scores
Source	Rating
Metacritic	66/100
Review scores
Source	Rating
AbsolutePunk	(59%)
AllMusic	3/5 stars
The A.V. Club	C+
The Guardian	2/5 stars
NME	7/10
Paste	8.3/10
Pitchfork	5.1/10
Rolling Stone	3.5/5 stars
Slant Magazine	2.5/5 stars
Sputnikmusic	3.0/5.0

Loyalty to Loyalty received generally favorable reviews but music critics were divided by the band's musical departure and Nathan Willett's delivery in terms of performance and songwriting. At Metacritic, which assigns a normalized rating out of 100 to reviews from mainstream critics, the album received an average score of 66, based on 20 reviews.

James McMahon of NME praised the band for their production and songwriting, concluding with "Almost in defiance of poor sales and cult following, CWK and their charming second album embody everything you hoped music might be." Bart Blasengame of Paste found the album "[to be] more interesting than Robbers and Cowards," praising the band for the new direction in their sound and calling it "a better-than-solid album from a band that seemed equipped to someday make a classic one." Jody Rosen of Rolling Stone commended the band for continuing with their blues rock sound, saying that "Cold War Kids attack their songs with unusual intensity, infusing even the most nourish, unsettling songs – fractured narratives about hipster bohemia and suicide – with a feeling enchantment."

Rudy Klap of Sputnikmusic gave praise to the production and songwriting, singling out "Golden Gate Jumpers" with having "one of the record's best lyrics and melodies," but was critical of Willett's performance saying that "his voice can turn from interesting and fresh to grating and intolerable with just a few misplaced falsettos." Heather Phares of AllMusic was also critical about Willett throughout the album, finding his voice "unfettered to the point of grating ("Something Is Not Right with Me")" and lyrics to be "overworked instead of clever ("Against Privacy")" but found some of the songs carried sharp songwriting skills ("Golden Gate Jumpers") and flair ("I've Seen Enough") concluding that "Cold War Kids deserve credit for their ambitions, but there's a fine line between trying hard and trying too hard. More often than not, Loyalty to Loyalty takes a disappointing stumble on it."

Chris Mincher of The A.V. Club was disappointed with the album, finding it stripped of its songwriting and control in lead singer Nathan Willett's voice from their debut album. Blake Solomon of AbsolutePunk found the album lacking in terms of instrumentals and songwriting saying, "It's easy to see the great ideas from previous songs at work here, but there seems to be an intentional restraint placed on the band's likeable pop inclinations." The Guardian criticized the album for its lackluster blues rock production and Willett's performance, saying "his voice is too drearily clean-cut to deliver a true emotional punch." Ian Cohen of Pitchfork felt that the album was hampered by the band's uninspired musicianship and songwriting and the hype surrounding them, saying that "Proponents raved that Cold War Kids arrived fully formed, but as the band continues to stubbornly emphasize their weaknesses, Loyalty To Loyalty is proof that their detractors can say the same thing."

== Commercial performance ==
Loyalty to Loyalty was the band's first album to reach the top 50 on the Billboard 200, debuting at number 21 with 22,000 copies sold in its first week. It later dropped to number 74 the next week before leaving the chart. It additionally charted within the top 40 of several additional territories, surpassing what Robbers & Cowards achieved previously. The record debuted at number 20 in Australia before dropping to number 35 the next week and leaving the chart. It debuted at numbers 29 and 48 in Belgium and France respectively (whereas their previous album charted at numbers 43 and 79). However, it charted thirty-three spots lower than Robbers & Cowards in the United Kingdom, entering at number 68 in that country for one week.

== Track listing ==
All tracks are written by Cold War Kids.

No.	Title	Length
1.	"Against Privacy"	3:45
2.	"Mexican Dogs"	3:36
3.	"Every Valley Is Not a Lake"	3:38
4.	"Something Is Not Right with Me"	2:22
5.	"Welcome to the Occupation"	3:21
6.	"Golden Gate Jumpers"	3:12
7.	"Avalanche in B"	3:46
8.	"I've Seen Enough"	2:58
9.	"Every Man I Fall For"	4:08
10.	"Dreams Old Men Dream"	4:16
11.	"On the Night My Love Broke Through"	4:36
12.	"Relief"	3:02
13.	"Cryptomnesia"	4:01

== Personnel ==
Adapted from the Loyalty to Loyalty inlay notes.

Cold War Kids

- Nathan Willett – lead vocals, piano, rhythm guitar
- Jonnie Russell – lead guitar, keyboards, backing vocals
- Matthew Aveiro – drums, percussion
- Matthew Maust – bass guitar

Additional musicians

- Zac Rae – chamberlain (on "I've Seen Enough")

Artwork

- Maust – design
- Matt Wignall – photography

Production

- Kevin Augunas – producer, recording, mixing
- Cold War Kids – producer
- Bob Ludwig – mastering
- Greg Koller – additional engineering
- Matt Wignall – additional engineering
- Eric Caudieux – additional engineering

== Charts ==
Chart (2008)	Peak position
Australian Albums (ARIA)	20
Belgian Albums (Ultratop Flanders)	29
Belgian Albums (Ultratop Wallonia)	95
French Albums (SNEP)	48
UK Albums (OCC)	68
US Billboard 200	21
US Top Alternative Albums (Billboard)	6
US Independent Albums (Billboard)	3

== Release history ==
Region	Date	Format	Label	Ref.
Australia	September 19, 2008	Digital download, CD, Vinyl	V2	
Germany	September 19, 2008	Digital download, CD, Vinyl	V2	
United Kingdom	September 22, 2008	Digital download, CD, Vinyl	V2	
United States	September 23, 2008	Digital download, CD, Vinyl	Downtown	
France	October 6, 2008	CD	Cooperative Music	
