= Rotary Downs =

American indie rock band

Background information
- Origin: New Orleans, Louisiana, USA
- Genres: Rock, indie rock
- Years active: 2002–present
- Label: Rookery Records
- Members: James Marler; Chris Colombo; Zack Smith; Jason Rhein; Alex Smith
- Past members: Tiffany Lamson; Cory Schultz; Michael Girardot; Anthony Cuccia; Matt Aguiluz
- Website: Official Website

Rotary Downs is an indie rock band from New Orleans, Louisiana. The band is made up of vocalist and guitarist James Marler, guitarist Chris Colombo, guitarist Alex Smith, bassist Jason Rhein, and drummer Zack Smith.

== History ==
Rotary Downs is a two-time winner of the "Best Rock Band" category at Gambit Weekly's Big Easy Music Awards. NPR's Morning Edition considers them "outsider artists" and characterized their 2007 album Chained To The Chariot as "a stunning collection of psychedelic art-pop songs that play like brilliant mash-ups of Neutral Milk Hotel and Odelay-era Beck".

Chained To The Chariot was recorded in the months preceding and following Hurricane Katrina's devastation of New Orleans, as described in a feature on Current TV. Some of the band's recorded work on the album was damaged by the flood, but later salvaged. In the wake of the disaster, band members described a sense of increased artistic collaboration and cross-pollination in the music scene in New Orleans.

On March 9, 2010, Rotary Downs released Cracked Maps & Blue Reports, described by Filter magazine as "perfectly New Orleanian: both high and low, in and out, joyous and mournful."

== Discography ==
- Rotary Downs (2002)
- Long After The Thrill (2003)
- Quitters (EP) (2004)
- Chained To The Chariot (2006)
- Cracked Maps & Blue Reports (2010)
- Traces (2014)
