= Cold War Kids =

American indie rock band

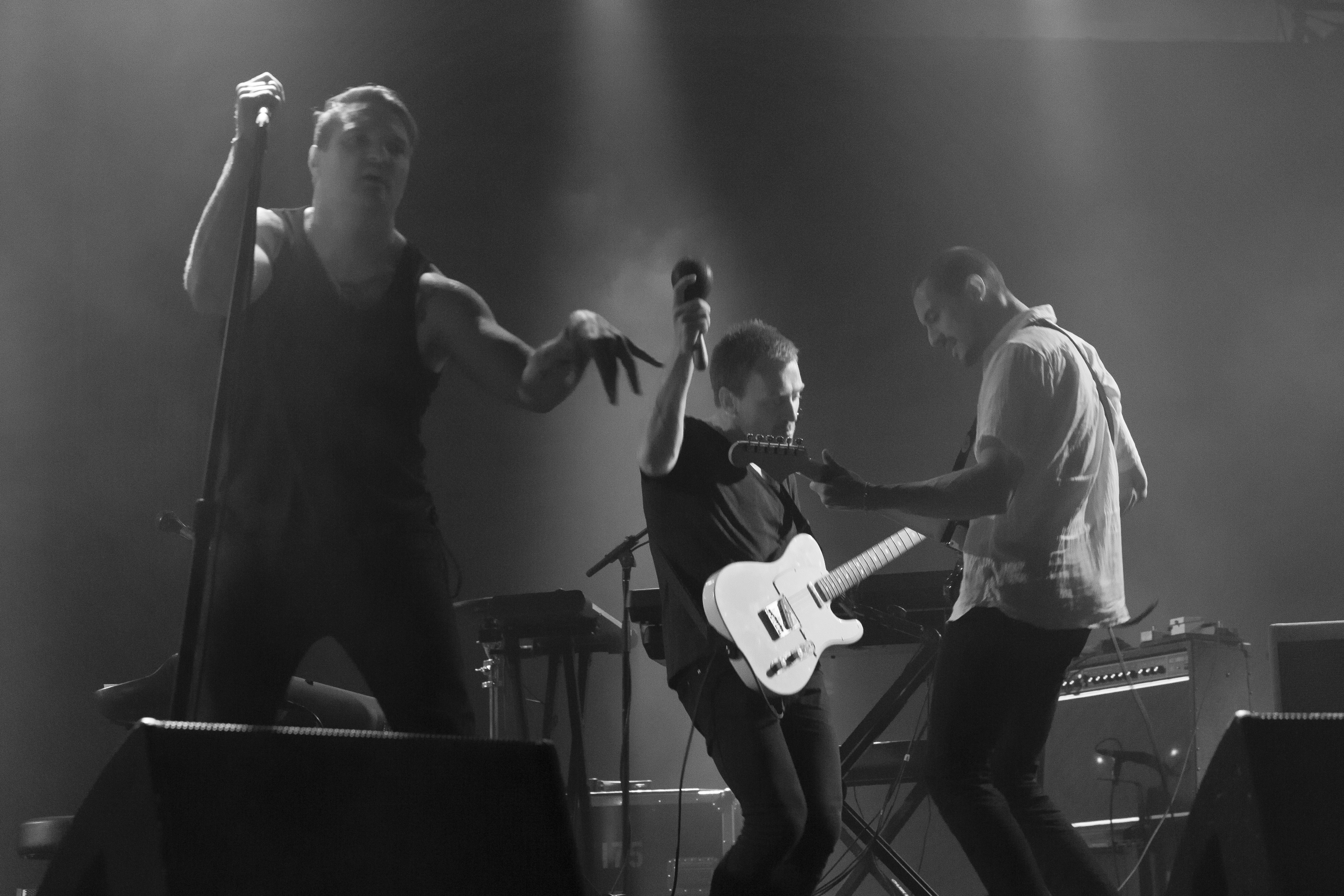
- Cold War Kids performing at the Byron Bay Bluesfest in Australia, 2016

Background information
- Origin: Long Beach, California, U.S.
- Genres: Indie rock; blues rock; blue-eyed soul
- Years active: 2004–present
- Labels: Capitol; Downtown; MapleMusic; V2; Monarchy
- Members: Nathan Willett; Matt Maust; David Quon; Matthew Schwartz; Joe Plummer
- Past members: Dann Gallucci; Matt Aveiro; Jonnie Russell
- Website: coldwarkids.com

Cold War Kids are an American indie rock band from Long Beach, California. Band members are Nathan Willett (vocals, piano, guitar), Matt Maust (bass guitar), David Quon (guitar, backing vocals), Matthew Schwartz (keyboards, backing vocals, guitar, percussion), and Joe Plummer (drums, percussion). Former members of the band include Dann Gallucci (guitar, keyboards, percussion), Matt Aveiro (drums, percussion), and Jonnie Russell (guitar, vocals, piano, keyboards, percussion).

Forming in 2004 in Fullerton, California, the Cold War Kids' early releases came from independent record label Monarchy Music. In 2006, the band signed with Downtown/V2 and released their major label debut Robbers & Cowards to cult appeal from fans and critics. 2008's Loyalty to Loyalty and 2011's Mine Is Yours saw the band develop different musical sounds and lyrical content throughout to mixed reviews. The band's seventh studio album, New Age Norms 1, was released on November 1, 2019.

== History ==
=== 2004–2006: early years and Robbers & Cowards ===
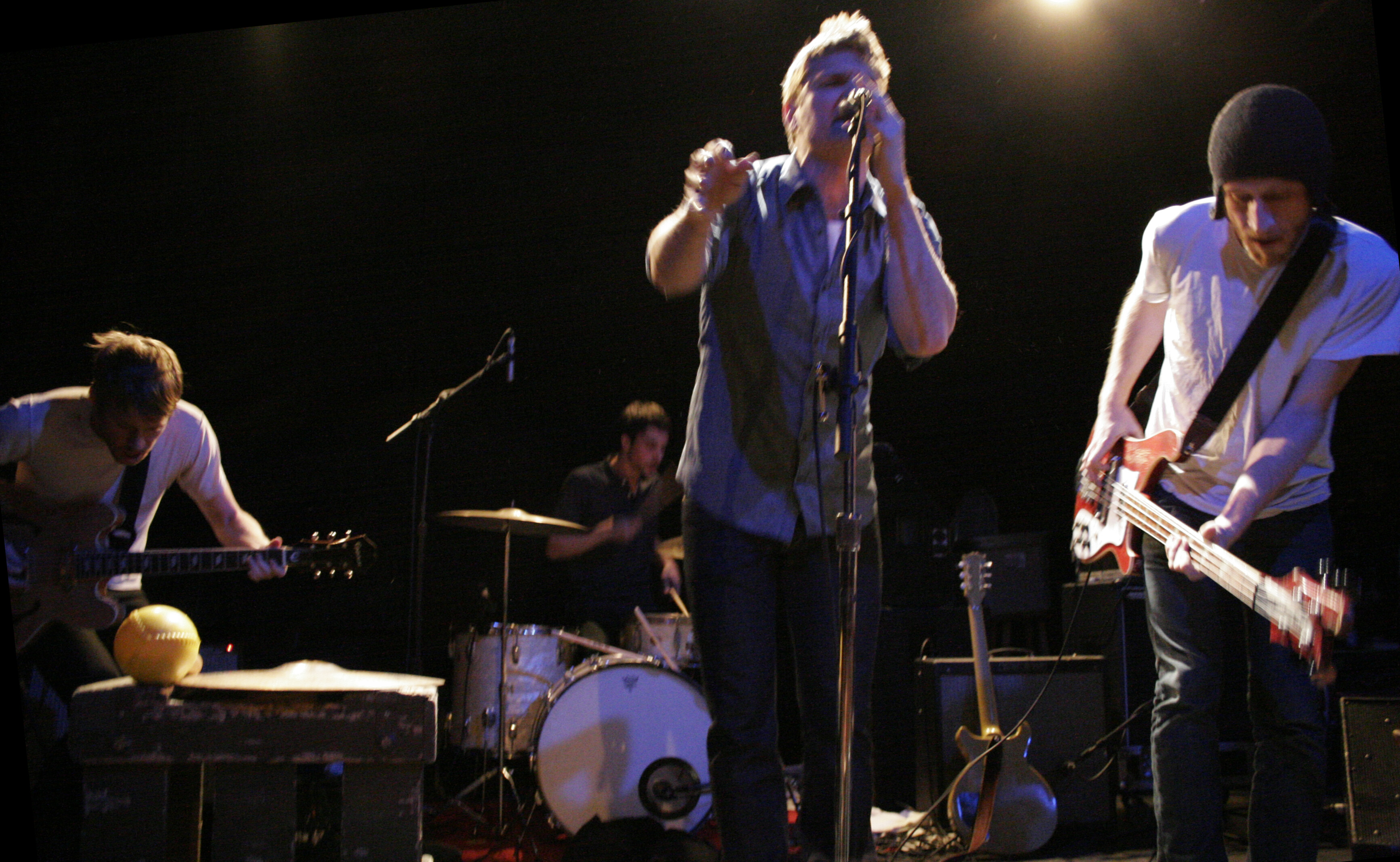
Cold War Kids performing at the Bowery Ballroom in New York City, 2007

The members of Cold War Kids met at Biola University. They formed a band in 2004 when they would meet regularly in Jonnie Russell's apartment above a restaurant called Mulberry Street in downtown Fullerton. Maust came up with the band's name around 1997, during his travels in Eastern Europe with his brother, where they found a park in Budapest with missing statues, taken away after Communism fell. Seeing that there was a playground in the park, Maust said "...being in that environment just made the phrase 'Cold War Kids' pop into my head. I may have heard it before. I'm a Cold War kid, too – I was born in 1979." Maust used the name for his personal website, but then he repurposed it after the band decided to use the name. The band relocated to Whittier, California, and began recording their first demo, which Monarchy Music released as the EP Mulberry Street (based on the restaurant where they regularly met) in spring 2005. Between tours, the band released two more EPs: With Our Wallets Full and Up in Rags, in 2006. Monarchy Music would re-release those EPs as one compilation album titled Up in Rags/With Our Wallets Full in 2006.

In summer 2006, Cold War Kids signed with Downtown Records and started work on their debut album. The album titled Robbers & Cowards was released on October 10, 2006, with sales close to 200,000 copies. Critics were impressed with the band's blues rock sound and lyrics that told morose tales of yesteryear: Joe Tacopino of PopMatters said that "These ambitious youngsters are definitely worth the trip, even without the ostentatious vocal harmonies." Jeff Weiss of Stylus Magazine called the album "[It's] a good debut, maybe even a very good one. Whether or not this band will achieve greatness remains anybody's guess." One of the album's biggest detractors came from Marc Hogan of Pitchfork, who criticized the band for its songwriting, melodies, and Christian symbolism, saying that "Robbers and Cowards insults our intelligence a few times too often." Cat Dirt Sez of the San Diego CityBeat said that Hogan's review was an example of lazy journalism, with lead guitarist Jonnie Russell saying that the reviewer wanted a wittier approach to the album rather than a thoughtful assessment of it.

=== 2008: Loyalty to Loyalty ===
After two years of non-stop worldwide touring and an eventual relocation to Long Beach, California, Cold War Kids went back into the studio in spring 2008 with the producer of their first record, Kevin Augunas. Nathan described the record making process: "Throughout the record making process, we would write songs in our own little practice studio, then we'd go into the studio for, like, two days and record three or four songs, then go back into our own practice studio for, like, a few weeks. So really it was over the span of four months or something. Actual studio days probably like 15 days. We don't love being in a studio; we focus more on the writing."

Cold War Kids' second album, Loyalty to Loyalty, represented a departure from its debut, featuring a lot of narrative storytelling, as well as political and philosophical references. In an interview with NPR, Nathan described the songwriting process for the album: "The choices that we make have always been organic ones, to try to grow at a rate that makes sense," Willett says. "Not necessarily talking about, 'Is there a great single? Is this a big breakthrough for us? Is this the next level for us?' But just write songs. Yeah, there is a stress, and the way we deal with it is to ignore it." Loyalty to Loyalty was released on September 23, 2008, to generally positive reviews from critics. Bart Blasengame of Paste called it "a better-than-solid album from a band that seemed equipped to someday make a classic one". James McMahon of NME said that "Almost in defiance of poor sales and cult following, CWK and their charming second album embody everything you hoped music might be."

=== 2009–2011: Behave Yourself and Mine is Yours ===
Cold War Kids spent the end of 2008 and most of 2009 on the road touring for Loyalty to Loyalty, highlighted by a national tour with Death Cab for Cutie. In between touring, the band returned to the studio to record what would become their seventh EP, Behave Yourself. In an interview with Flavorwire, Maust talked about the differences between this and Loyalty to Loyalty: "It's basically the happier, more vibrant songs that didn't really fit on the [Loyalty] album. We realized that in a way, we were starting to work ahead of ourselves, so this [EP] works as a nice bridge between records." Behave Yourself was released digitally on iTunes on December 21, 2009, and given a physical version on January 19, 2010.

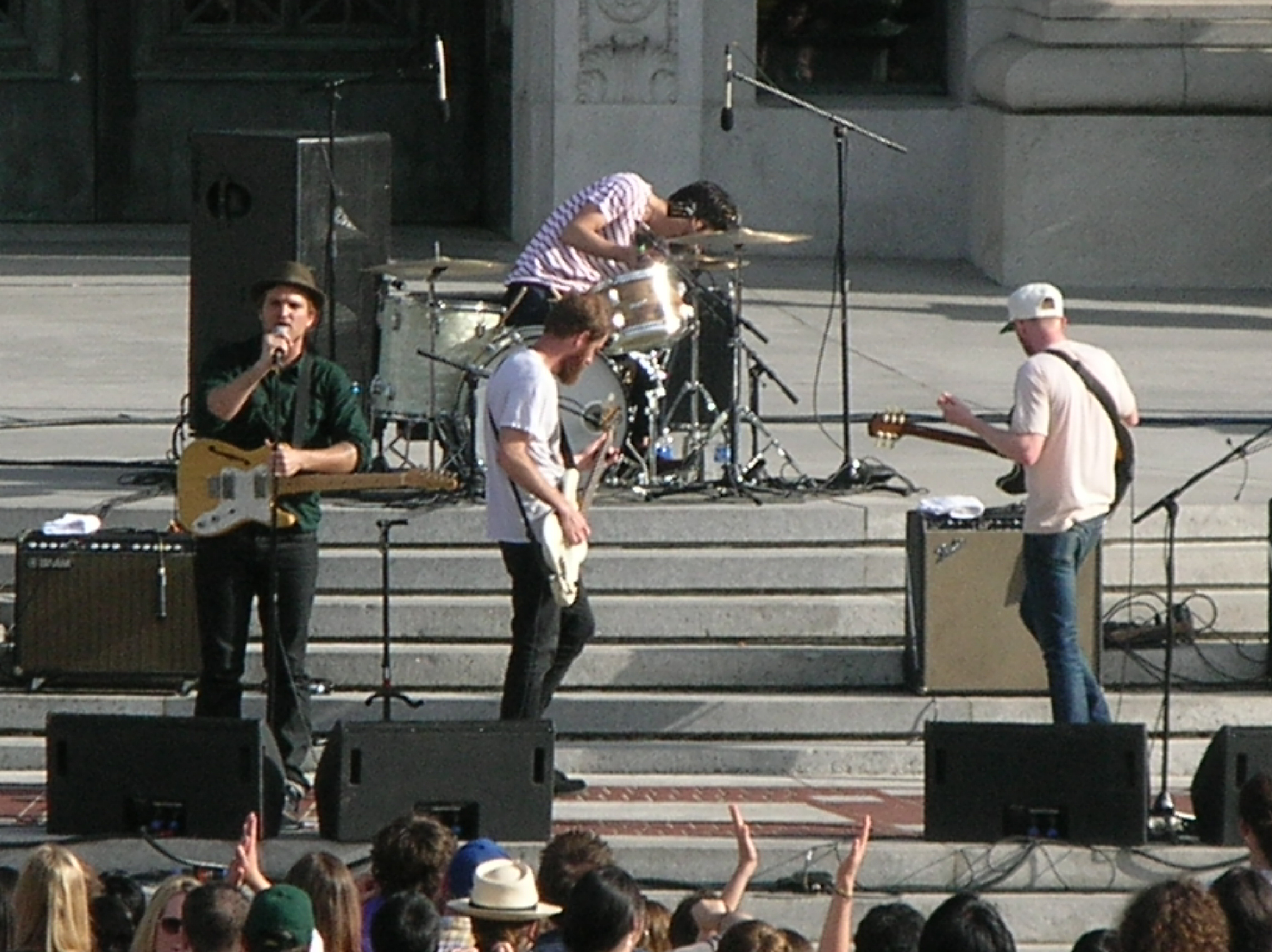
Cold War Kids performing at Cal Day 2010 in UC Berkeley on April 17

Cold War Kids went back into the studio in February 2010. Willett, when speaking to Filter Magazine, said, "Album three is in the works now. We are working with a producer named Jacquire King. He has a sweet and eclectic roster of Modest Mouse, the last Norah Jones record, Tom Waits' Mule Variations, the last Kings of Leon record...So, he is going to work miracles with us. All of our music has always been written entirely by us, without any influence, so to have him step in and help us with the direction is tremendous. I was just watching the Wilco Documentary again, and I think that in many ways Wilco is to country/Americana as Cold War Kids is to soul/punk. We are taking what we do to the next level on this record. The EP is the final reminder of the good old days of quick and fun, minimal Cold War Kids recording."

Mine Is Yours was released on January 25, 2011, and garnered mixed reviews from critics. Billboard said that "the band has emerged with a set that's more inviting than its first but just as catchy." Sean O'Neal of The A.V. Club said that the album has "the bland sound of a band trading identity for ambition". Cold War Kids supported the album with a spring tour across North America that included festival appearances at Bonnaroo and Coachella. In February 2012, the band announced that lead guitarist Jonnie Russell left the band for personal reasons.

=== 2012–2015: Dear Miss Lonelyhearts and Hold My Home ===
In January 2012, Cold War Kids announced that former Modest Mouse guitarist Dann Gallucci would take Russell's place in the band and premiere on their new single "Minimum Day". On January 15, 2013, the band announced a new single, "Miracle Mile", for their fourth album, Dear Miss Lonelyhearts. The latter was released on April 2, 2013. They followed that up with an EP titled Tuxedos, released on September 17, 2013. They promoted both efforts with a U.S. headline tour that ended on November 6, 2013. In November 2013, they announced that a fifth album was in the works. On November 10, 2013, the Orange County Register reported that drummer Matt Aveiro had left the band, and that Modest Mouse drummer Joe Plummer would be holding his place indefinitely.

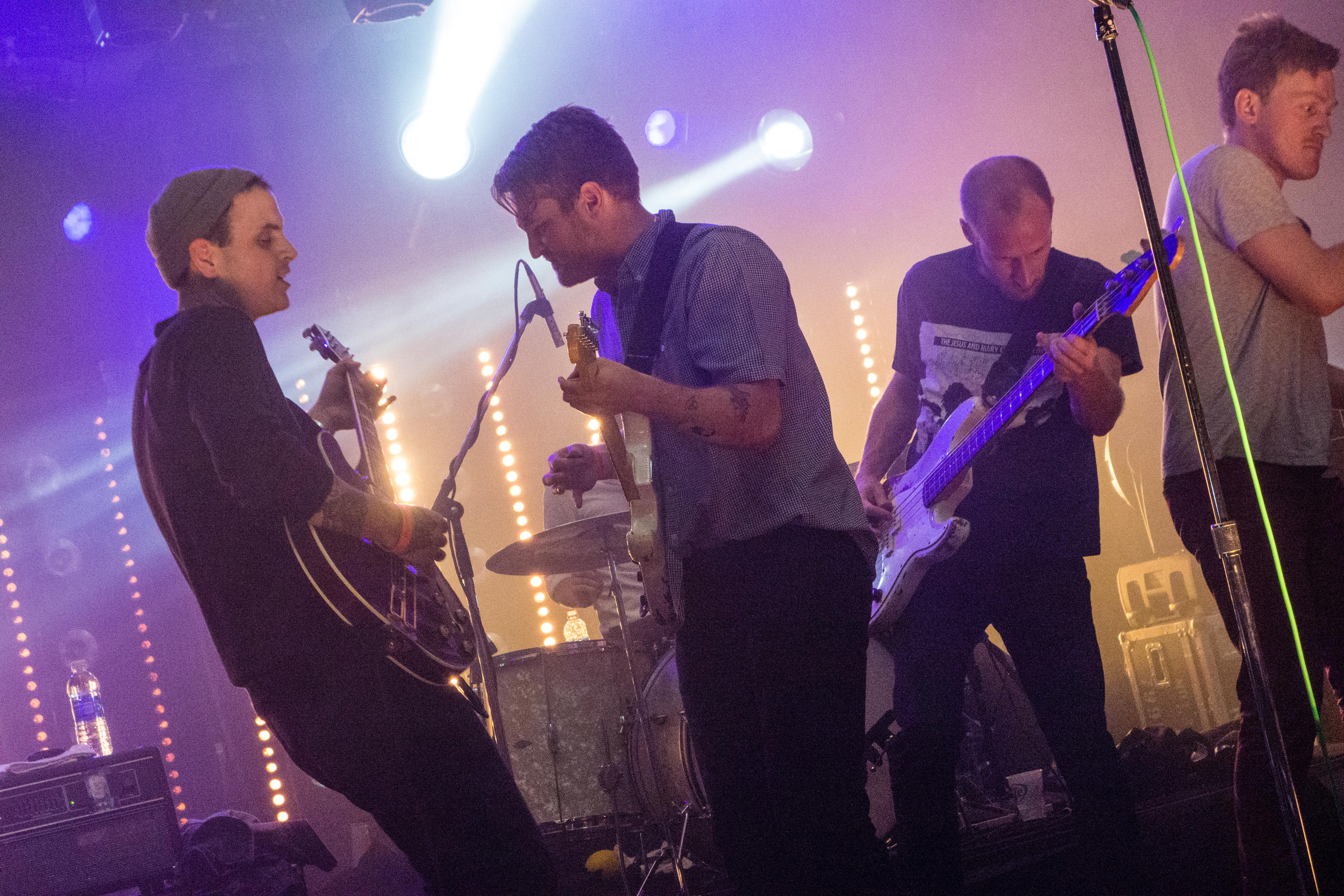
Cold War Kids performing at the Hype Hotel in Texas at SXSW, 2013

In March 2014, Cold War Kids collaborated with Belgian brewer Stella Artois and sonic inventor Andy Cavatorta for a project titled "Chalice Symphony" that involved using the brewer's famous drinking glasses as instruments for the band to use to record the track "A Million Eyes". The behind-the-scenes videos were used as commercials and were uploaded on the brewer's YouTube page. The song was released on iTunes on March 3, 2014, and the music video that went along with the track premiered on YouTube on April 4, 2014. In May 2014, Willett and Maust worked on a side project with We Barbarians' Nathan Warkentin called French Style Furs. The project's debut album, Is Exotic Bait, was released on July 8, 2014. The album was recorded with the assistance of Nick Launay, and the lyrics used were adapted from the poetry of twentieth-century Catholic monk and philosopher Thomas Merton.

On July 15, 2014, Cold War Kids released the first single, "All This Could Be Yours", from their fifth album Hold My Home, which was released on October 21. The release of Hold My Home had drummer Joe Plummer and multi-instrumentalist/singer Matthew Schwartz being credited as proper members of the band on the album's liner notes as opposed to touring members as previously credited. The album also spawned the single "First" in February 2015. Despite mixed reactions from critics on the overall quality and consistency of the album, "First" went on to chart at number 1 on the Billboard Alternative Songs chart, making it the band's highest-charting single ever.

=== 2016–2018: L.A. Divine ===
On March 16, 2016, Cold War Kids announced via their Instagram the departure of lead guitarist Dann Gallucci and that he was to be replaced by We Barbarians' David Quon.

On October 31, 2016, Cold War Kids released a single called wikt:"Locker Room Talk", as part of the 30 Days, 50 Songs project protesting Donald Trump's presidential run. The band stated that "At this point in the game, taking a shot at Trump almost feels unnecessary. Too easy. More negativity. We're all so tired of him. But when I heard Death Cab's song, I realized that's a mistake. It's important to state the obvious, to express those feelings in a song. Even if it's maybe redundant, it feels great to let it all out!"

On February 2, 2017, Cold War Kids released the lead single, entitled "Love Is Mystical", to their sixth studio album, L.A. Divine, which was released on April 7, 2017.

On December 7, 2018, Cold War Kids released the double disc compilation album This Will All Blow Over In Time, featuring radio singles as well as unreleased and rare tracks.

=== 2019 to present: New Age Norms and Cold War Kids ===
On November 1, 2019, Cold War Kids released their seventh studio album, New Age Norms 1. The band released "Complainer" and "4th of July" as a double single ahead of its release on June 18. Cold War Kids set a fall U.S. headlining tour to promote the album. The album was followed by New Age Norms 2 and 3 in 2020 and 2021 respectively; the albums were intended to form a trilogy in which the band explored more topical songwriting. During the summer of 2023, the band opened for Tears for Fears for the resumption of their tour behind the album The Tipping Point. On November 3, the band's tenth studio album, Cold War Kids was released . The band are expected to tour in 2024 to promote their new album.

== Musical style and influences ==
AllMusic's Heather Phares cites Bob Dylan, Billie Holiday, Jeff Buckley, and The Velvet Underground as influences for the band's blues rock-influenced indie rock sound. The band has identified other major influences as Fiona Apple, Nick Cave, Led Zeppelin, Radiohead, The Smiths, U2, and Tom Waits.

== Members ==
Current members

- Nathan Willett – lead vocals, piano, rhythm guitar, percussion (2004–present)
- Matt Maust – bass guitar (2004–present)
- Joe Plummer – drums (2013–present)
- Matthew Schwartz – keyboards, rhythm guitar, backing vocals, percussion (2014–present; touring musician 2013–2014)
- David Quon – lead guitar, backing vocals (2016–present)

Former members

- Jonnie Russell – lead guitar, backing vocals, percussion, piano, keyboards (2004–2012)
- Matt Aveiro – drums (2004–2013)
- Dann Gallucci – lead guitar, keyboards, percussion (2012–2016)

Timeline

== Discography ==
=== Albums ===
==== Studio albums ====
List of studio albums, with selected chart positions
Title	Album details	Peak chart positions									
Title	Album details	US	AUS	AUT	BEL (FL)	BEL (WA)	FRA	IRL	NLD	SCO	UK
Robbers & Cowards	Released: October 10, 2006 (US); Label: Downtown, V2; Formats: CD, LP, digital download	173	69	—	43	—	79	50	96	33	35
Loyalty to Loyalty	Released: September 23, 2008 (US); Label: Downtown, V2; Formats: CD, LP, digital download	21	20	—	29	95	48	93	— (Note: Loyalty to Loyalty did not enter the Dutch Album Top 100, but peaked at number 26 on the Dutch Alternative Albums chart.)	64	68
Mine Is Yours	Released: January 25, 2011 (US); Label: Downtown, V2; Formats: CD, LP, digital download	21	9	56	54	—	128	—	— (Note: Mine Is Yours did not enter the Dutch Album Top 100, but peaked at number 14 on the Dutch Alternative Albums chart.)	96	84
Dear Miss Lonelyhearts	Released: April 2, 2013 (US); Label: Downtown, V2; Formats: CD, LP, digital download	52	48	—	96	142	—	—	—	—	149
Hold My Home	Released: October 21, 2014 (US); Label: Downtown, V2; Formats: CD, LP, digital download	56	61	—	—	—	—	—	—	—	—
L.A. Divine	Released: April 7, 2017 (US); Label: Capitol; Formats: CD, LP, digital download	69	—	—	—	—	—	—	—	—	—
New Age Norms 1	Released: November 1, 2019 (US); Label: CWKTWO, AWAL; Formats: CD, LP, digital download	— (Note: New Age Norms 1 did not enter the US Billboard 200, but peaked at number 81 on the Top Current Album Sales Chart.)	—	—	—	—	—	—	—	—	—
New Age Norms 2	Released: August 21, 2020 (US); Label: CWKTWO, AWAL; Formats: CD, LP, digital download	—	—	—	—	—	—	—	—	—	—
New Age Norms 3	Released: September 24, 2021 (US); Label: CWKTWO, AWAL; Formats: CD, LP, digital download	—	—	—	—	—	—	—	—	—	—
Cold War Kids	Released: November 3, 2023 (US); Label: CWKTWO, AWAL; Formats: CD, LP, digital download	—	—	—	—	—	—	—	—	—	—
"—" denotes a recording that did not chart or was not released in that territory.

==== Live albums ====
List of live albums
Title	Album details
iTunes Live from SoHo	Released: December 2, 2008 (US); Label: Downtown; Formats: Digital download
Live at Third Man	Released: March 29, 2011 (US); Label: Third Man; Formats: LP
Audience (Live)	Released: April 13, 2018 (US); Recorded 9/24/17 in Athens, GA; Label: Capitol; Formats: Digital download

==== Compilation albums ====
List of compilation albums
Title	Album details
Up in Rags/With Our Wallets Full	Released: February 2006 (US); Label: Monarchy; Formats: LP
This Will All Blow Over in Time	Released: December 7, 2018 (US); Label: Downtown; Formats: CD, LP, DL

=== Extended plays ===
List of extended plays, with selected chart positions
Title	Extended play details	Peak chart positions	
Title	Extended play details	US	US Ind.
Mulberry Street	Released: June 15, 2005 (US); Label: Monarchy; Formats: CD	—	—
With Our Wallets Full	Released: November 2005 (US); Label: Monarchy; Formats: CD	—	—
Up in Rags	Released: January 2006 (US); Label: Monarchy; Formats: CD	—	—
We Used to Vacation	Released: November 27, 2006 (US); Label: V2; Formats: CD, LP, 7", digital download	—	—
Live at Fingerprints	Released: September 23, 2008 (US); Label: Downtown; Formats: CD, digital download	—	—
Live from the Paradiso	Released: December 2, 2008 (US); Label: Downtown; Formats: CD, digital download	—	—
Behave Yourself	Released: January 19, 2010 (US); Label: Downtown, V2; Formats: CD, LP, digital download	177	48
Tuxedos	Released: September 17, 2013 (US); Label: Downtown; Formats: 10", digital download	—	—
Five Quick Cuts	Released: April 18, 2015 (US); Label: Downtown; Formats: 10", digital download	—	—
Love Is Re-Myxtical	Released: July 14, 2017; Label: CWKTWO, AWAL; Formats: Digital download	—	—
Los Feliz Blvd	Released: July 28, 2017; Label: Capitol; Formats: Digital download	—	—
So So So So Tied Up	Released: October 31, 2017; Label: Capitol, CWKTWO; Formats: Digital download	—	—
Complainer (Remixes)	Released: December 6, 2019; Label: CWKTWO, AWAL; Formats: Digital download	—	—
Strings & Keys	Released: January 24, 2020; Label: CWKTWO, AWAL; Formats: Digital download	—	—
"—" denotes a recording that did not chart or was not released in that territory.

=== Singles ===
==== As lead artist ====
List of singles, with selected chart positions, showing year released and album name
Title	Year	Peak chart positions										Certifications	Album
Title	Year	US Bub.	US Rock	AUS	BEL (FL)	BEL (WA)	CAN	CAN Rock	MEX	SCO	UK	Certifications	Album
"Hair Down"	2006	—	—	—	—	—	—	—	—	—	—		Robbers & Cowards
"We Used to Vacation"	2006	—	—	—	—	—	—	—	—	—	— (Note: "We Used to Vacation" did not enter the UK Singles Chart, but peaked at number 88 on the UK Physical Singles Chart Top 100.)		Robbers & Cowards
"Hang Me Up to Dry"	2007	22	— (Note: "Hang Me Up to Dry" did not enter the Hot Rock & Alternative Songs chart, but peaked at number 26 on the Alternative Airplay chart.)	—	—	—	—	42	—	22	57	RIAA: Gold	Robbers & Cowards
"Hospital Beds"	2007	—	—	—	—	—	—	—	—	63	140		Robbers & Cowards
"Something Is Not Right with Me"	2008	—	— (Note: "Something Is Not Right with Me" did not enter the Hot Rock & Alternative Songs chart, but peaked at number 39 on the Alternative Airplay chart.)	—	—	—	—	—	—	67	— (Note: "Something Is Not Right with Me" did not enter the UK Singles Chart, but peaked at number 50 on the UK Physical Singles Chart Top 100.)		Loyalty to Loyalty
"I've Seen Enough"	2008	—	—	—	—	—	—	—	—	—	—		Loyalty to Loyalty
"Audience"	2009	—	— (Note: "Audience" did not enter the Hot Rock & Alternative Songs chart, but peaked at number 39 on the Alternative Airplay chart.)	—	—	—	—	37	—	—	—		Behave Yourself EP
"Louder Than Ever"	2010	—	48	—	81	—	—	43	35	—	—		Mine Is Yours
"Skip the Charades"	2011	—	— (Note: "Skip the Charades" did not enter the Hot Rock & Alternative Songs chart, but peaked at number 43 on the Rock Digital Songs chart.)	—	—	—	—	—	—	—	—	RIAA: Gold	Mine Is Yours
"Minimum Day"	2012	—	—	—	—	—	—	—	—	—	—		Non-album single
"Miracle Mile"	2013	—	— (Note: "Miracle Mile" did not enter the Hot Rock & Alternative Songs chart, but peaked at number 48 on the Rock & Alternative Airplay chart.)	—	—	—	—	36	—	—	—		Dear Miss Lonelyhearts
"A Million Eyes"	2014	—	—	—	—	—	—	—	—	—	—		Non-album single
"All This Could Be Yours"	2014	—	— (Note: "All This Could Be Yours" did not enter the Hot Rock & Alternative Songs chart, but peaked at number 36 on the Alternative Airplay chart.)	—	—	—	—	—	—	—	—		Hold My Home
"First"	2015	5	8	38	—	—	72	5	—	—	—	RIAA: Platinum; ARIA: Gold; MC: Gold	Hold My Home
"Locker Room Talk"	2016	—	—	—	—	—	—	—	—	—	—		30 Days, 30 Songs
"Love Is Mystical"	2017	—	16	—	—	89	—	4	39	—	—		L.A. Divine
"Can We Hang On?"	2017	—	— (Note: "Can We Hang On?" did not enter the Hot Rock & Alternative Songs chart, but peaked at number 36 on the Rock & Alternative Airplay chart.)	—	—	—	—	—	—	—	—		L.A. Divine
"Restless"	2017	—	—	—	—	—	—	—	—	—	—		L.A. Divine
"Love On the Brain" (featuring Bishop Briggs)	2017	—	—	—	—	—	—	—	—	—	—		Los Feliz Blvd EP
"So Tied Up" (featuring Bishop Briggs)	2017	—	28	—	—	—	—	48	—	—	—		L.A. Divine
"Complainer" / "4th of July"	2019	—	23	—	—	—	—	14	—	—	—		New Age Norms 1
"Complainer (Strings & Keys)"	2019	—	—	—	—	—	—	—	—	—	—		Strings & Keys EP
"Who's Gonna Love Me Now"	2020	—	— (Note: "Who's Gonna Love Me Now" did not enter the Hot Rock & Alternative Songs chart, but peaked at number 30 on the Rock & Alternative Airplay chart.)	—	—	—	—	42	—	—	—		New Age Norms 2
"1 x 1" (featuring Wesley Schultz)	2020	—	—	—	—	—	—	—	—	—	—		Non-album single
"What You Say" (solo or featuring Zella Day)	2021	—	— (Note: "What You Say" did not enter the Hot Rock & Alternative Songs chart, but peaked at number 18 on the Rock & Alternative Airplay chart.)	—	—	—	—	6	—	—	—		New Age Norms 3
"Double Life"	2023	—	—	—	—	—	—	—	—	—	—		Cold War Kids
"Run Away with Me"	2023	—	— (Note: "Run Away with Me" did not enter the Hot Rock & Alternative Songs chart, but peaked at number 11 on the Rock & Alternative Airplay chart.)	—	—	—	—	7	—	—	—		Cold War Kids
"Heaven In Your Hands"	2024	—	—	—	—	—	—	—	—	—	—		Non-album single
"Meditations"	2024	—	—	—	—	—	—	11	—	—	—		Non-album single
"—" denotes a recording that did not chart or was not released in that territory.

==== As featured artist ====
List of singles showing year released and album name
Title	Year	Peak chart positions		Album
Title	Year	CAN AC	CAN Rock	Album
"Start a Fire" (Wargirl featuring Anne Dereaux & Cold War Kids)	2017	—	—	Non-album single
"Past Life" (Arkells featuring Cold War Kids)	2022	37	4	Blink Twice
"Nobody But Me" (The Knocks featuring Cold War Kids)	2022	—	—	History
"—" denotes a recording that did not chart or was not released in that territory.

==== Promotional singles ====
List of singles, with selected chart positions, showing year released and album name
Title	Year	Peak chart positions		Album
Title	Year	MEX	NLD	Album
"Finally Begin"	2011	—	99	Mine Is Yours
"Royal Blue"	2011	24	94	Mine Is Yours
"Lost That Easy"	2013	—	—	Dear Miss Lonelyhearts
"Loner Phase"	2013	—	—	Dear Miss Lonelyhearts
"Tuxedos"	2013	—	—	Dear Miss Lonelyhearts
"One Song at a Time"	2015	—	—	Five Quick Cuts
"Ordinary Idols"	2018	—	—	L.A. Divine
"Free to Breathe"	2018	—	—	L.A. Divine
"Can We Hang On? (Live)"	2018	—	—	Audience
"Waiting for Your Love"	2019	—	—	New Age Norms 1
"Dirt in My Eyes"	2019	—	—	New Age Norms 1
"I Can't Walk Away"	2021	—	—	New Age Norms 3
"—" denotes a recording that did not chart or was not released in that territory.

=== Other charted songs ===
Title	Year	Peak chart positions		Album
Title	Year	US Alt. DL	US Rock DL	Album
"Mine Is Yours"	2011	12	24	Mine Is Yours
