= Pimps of Joytime =

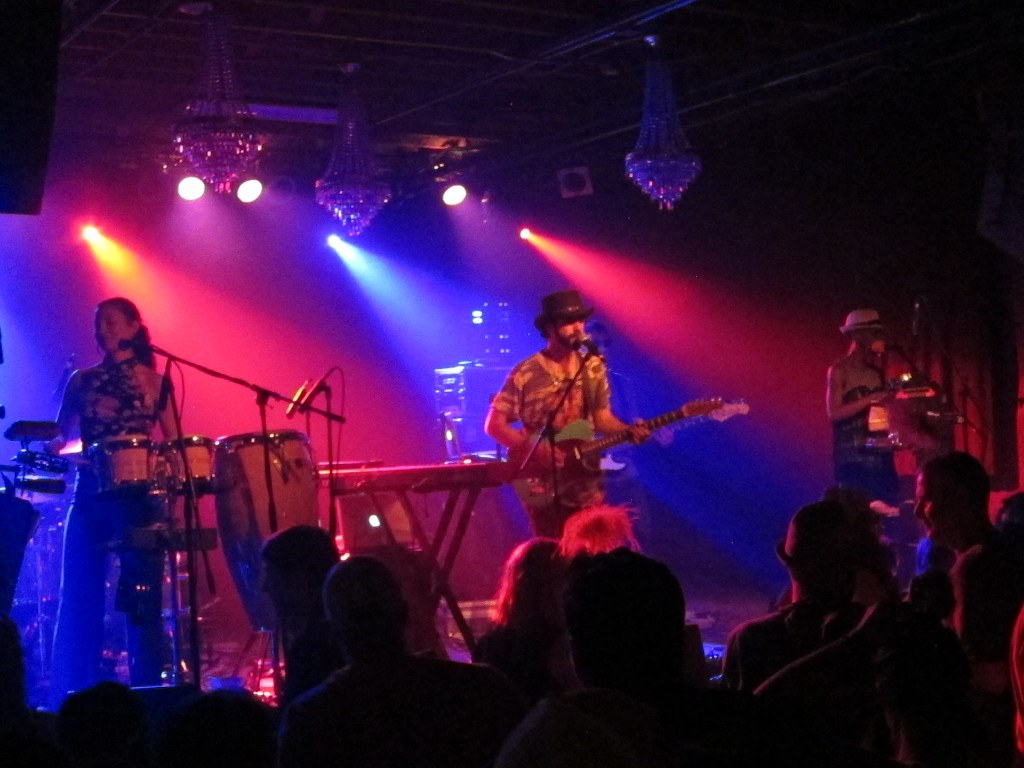
- Pimps of Joytime in 2013

Background information
- Origin: Brooklyn, New York, U.S.
- Genres: Soul, funk, afrobeat
- Years active: 2005–present
- Labels: Write Home Records
- Members: Brian Jay (vocals, guitar); Mayteana Morales (vocals, percussion); Kimberly Dawson (vocals); David Bailis (bass, keyboards, sampler); Anthony Cole (drums)
- Past members: Chauncey Yearwood; Black Pearl
- Website: pimpsofjoytime.com

Pimps of Joytime is an American soul music band from Brooklyn and New Orleans.

In May 2017 they performed at the 9th annual Rooster Walk Music and Arts Festival in Martinsville, Virginia.

== Discography ==
- 2007: High Steppin
- 2008: Funk Fixes and Remixes
- 2011: Janxta Funk!
- 2014: "Booty Text" (single)
- 2015: Jukestone Paradise
- 2017: Third Wall Chronicles
- 2022: Reachin' Up
