= Hang Me Up to Dry =

Single by Cold War Kids

from the album Robbers & Cowards
- B-side: "Every Valley Is Not a Lake"
- Released: January 29, 2007; July 9, 2007 (re-release)
- Recorded: 2006
- Studio: Tackyland (Long Beach, California)
- Genre: Indie rock; blues rock
- Length: 3:38
- Label: Downtown; V2
- Songwriter: Cold War Kids
- Producers: Matt Wignall; Cold War Kids

Cold War Kids singles chronology
"We Used to Vacation" (2006)	"Hang Me Up to Dry" (2007)	"Hospital Beds" (2007)

Music video
- "Hang Me Up to Dry" on YouTube

"Hang Me Up to Dry" is a song by American indie rock band Cold War Kids. Written and co-produced by all four band members and Matt Wignall, it originally came from their third EP Up in Rags (2006) and is the second track off their debut album Robbers & Cowards (2006). Lyrically, the song tells a story of a 'one-sided relationship' and uses the action of hanging wet clothes on a clothesline as a metaphor for the relationship.

It was released as a single on January 29, 2007 by Downtown and V2 Records, charting at number 57 in the UK and number 26 on the Billboard Alternative Songs chart. The song was re-released (using the same catalogue number and track listing) on July 9, 2007 but failed to break back into the charts. An accompanying music video for the song was directed by The Malloys and plays out like a trailer for an avant-garde film.

== Composition ==
According to the digital sheet music published at Musicnotes.com by Sony/ATV Music Publishing, the song is set in 4/4 time with a tempo of 92 beats per minute. It is composed in the key of E minor with lead singer Nathan Willett's vocal range spanning from the low-note of E_{3} to the high-note of B_{4}.

== Music video ==
Directed by The Malloys, the video is styled after an avant-garde film trailer. Shot in black-and-white, the video features fictitious reviewer quotes and film festival nominations. The video was uploaded on their record label's YouTube page on January 23, 2007.

== Live performances ==
Cold War Kids made their U.S. television debut performing "Hang Me Up to Dry" on the Late Show with David Letterman on December 21, 2006. They performed the song again on Late Night with Conan O'Brien on April 10, 2007. They made their U.K. television debut performing "Hang Me Up to Dry" and "Tell Me in the Morning" on Later... with Jools Holland on May 18, 2007.

== Accolades ==
The song ranked at number 46 on Rolling Stone's list of the 100 Best Songs of 2006 and was voted number 8 in the Triple J Hottest 100, 2007, alongside "Hospital Beds" which was voted number 37.

== Use in popular culture ==
- The song was covered by English singer Kate Nash.
- The song was used in the pilot episode of The CW series Gossip Girl.
- The song was used in the season 4 episode "Charlie Don't Surf" of the CBS series Numb3rs.
- USA Network used the track to promoting the second half of Burn Notice's third season.
- The song is a playable track in the 2009 music video game Band Hero.
- The song was used in the season 2 episode "Multiple Choices" of The CW series 90210.
- The song was covered by English rock duo Royal Blood.
- The song was used in 2023's Saltburn.

== Formats and track listing ==
- UK CD
  - 1. "Hang Me Up to Dry" – 3:40
  - 2. "Every Valley Is Not a Lake" – 3:23
  - 3. "Well Well Well" – 4:09
  - 4. "Heavy Boots" – 4:14
  UK 7" vinyl
  - A. "Hang Me Up to Dry" – 3:40
  - B. "Every Valley Is Not a Lake" – 3:23

== Charts and certifications ==
=== Weekly charts ===
Chart (2007)	Peak position
UK Singles (Official Charts Company)	57
US Bubbling Under Hot 100 (Billboard)	22
US Alternative Songs (Billboard)	26

=== Certifications ===
Region	Certification	Certified units/sales
New Zealand (RMNZ)	Gold	15,000^{‡}
United States (RIAA)	Gold	500,000^{‡}
^{‡} Sales+streaming figures based on certification alone.
