= Robbers & Cowards =

Studio album by Cold War Kids
- Released: October 10, 2006
- Recorded: August 2006
- Studios: Fairfax Recordings, Van Nuys, California (Sound City)
- Genres: Indie rock, blues rock
- Length: 52:52
- Labels: Downtown, V2
- Producers: Kevin Augunas, Cold War Kids

Cold War Kids chronology
Up in Rags/With Our Wallets Full (2006)	Robbers & Cowards (2006)	We Used to Vacation (2006)

Singles from Robbers & Cowards
- 1. "We Used to Vacation" Released: November 27, 2006; 2. "Hang Me Up to Dry" Released: January 29, 2007; 3. "Hospital Beds" Released: 2007

Robbers & Cowards is the debut studio album by American indie rock band Cold War Kids. It was released on October 10, 2006 by Downtown Records. The album received a generally positive reception from critics who praised the band's blues rock production and morose lyrics. Robbers & Cowards peaked at number 173 on the Billboard 200 and spawned three singles: "We Used to Vacation", "Hang Me Up to Dry" and "Hospital Beds". To promote the album, the band spent most of 2007 touring across North America and Europe through appearances at music festivals and talk shows.

== Promotion ==
On January 10, 2007, the band announced a 37-city extensive tour across North America that started with gigs alternating between New York City (Pianos, Mercury Lounge) and Los Angeles' Silverlake Lounge before ending with a two night gig in New York's Bowery Ballroom. On June 7, 2007, the band started touring with The White Stripes on their fall tour.

== Critical reception ==
Professional ratings
Review scores
Source	Rating
AllMusic	4/5 stars
The Guardian	3/5 stars
IGN	8.6/10
LAS Magazine	8.5/10
musicOMH	3/5 stars
Pitchfork	5.0/10
PopMatters	7/10 stars
Rolling Stone	4/5 stars
Stylus Magazine	B
Uncut	8/10

Robbers & Cowards received generally positive reviews from music critics who were impressed with the band's blues rock sound and lyrics that told morose tales of yesteryear. Joe Tacopino of PopMatters praised the tracks for their production and mature storytelling, calling the album "more subtle and honest than Jack White’s various projects." He concluded with, "These ambitious youngsters are definitely worth the trip, even without the ostentatious vocal harmonies." Despite finding the album a bit rushed and an amalgam of their previous EPs, Jeff Weiss of Stylus Magazine said that there's potential in the band from the first three singles concluding with, "It’s a good debut, maybe even a very good one. Whether or not this band will achieve greatness remains anybody’s guess." Chad Grischow of IGN praised the tightly crafted production for sounding crisp yet cluttered and the tracks for conveying various introspective topics concluding with, "The depth of the music, topics, and lyrics is something that most bands spend years trying to pull together, but Cold War Kids pull it off on their debut with ease." Betty Clarke of The Guardian commented on how the religious overtones in the songs can get tiring when Nathan Willett shouts about "murder and alcoholism that both sound like a tempting escape." But Clarke concluded by saying the band can still write great songs and Willett performs better sounding like Jeff Buckley than Jack White.

The album did receive some negative reception. Joe Crofton of musicOMH called the album a mixed bag, saying that it loses momentum after the first two tracks and drags towards its conclusion. He commented that the influence of the Internet on the indie scene may have lessened the album concluding with, "That isn't to say that this is a bad album but it definitely doesn't deserve the headache inducing amount of hype that has surrounded it." Sam Richards of Uncut found songs like "We Used to Vacation" and "Hang Me Up to Dry" showcased the band's "real gift for drama," but criticized the rest of the album for its misplaced blues production and sense of detachment from the songs. Marc Hogan of Pitchfork criticized the band for its songwriting, melodies and Christian symbolism, saying that "Robbers and Cowards insults our intelligence a few times too often." Cat Dirt Sez of the San Diego CityBeat said that Hogan's review was an example of lazy journalism, with lead guitarist Jonnie Russell saying that the reviewer wanted a wittier approach to the album rather than a thoughtful assessment of it.

The album was ranked number 30 by Rolling Stone on their list of Best Albums of 2006 and number 40 on Spin's list of The 40 Best Albums of 2006.

== Track listing ==
All tracks are written by Cold War Kids.

No.	Title	Length
1.	"We Used to Vacation"	4:01
2.	"Hang Me Up to Dry"	3:38
3.	"Tell Me in the Morning"	3:36
4.	"Hair Down"	3:40
5.	"Passing the Hat"	3:25
6.	"Saint John"	3:26
7.	"Robbers"	3:31
8.	"Hospital Beds"	4:46
9.	"Pregnant"	3:58
10.	"Red Wine, Success!"	2:37
11.	"God, Make Up Your Mind"	4:59
12.	"Rubidoux" (includes hidden track "Sermon vs. the Gospel" – 3:40)	11:02

== Personnel ==
Adapted from the Robbers & Cowards liner notes.

Band members

- Nathan Willett - lead vocals, piano, guitar
- Jonathan Bo Russell - guitar, piano, vocals
- Matt Aveiro - drums, percussion
- Matt Maust - bass

Production

- Cold War Kids - producer
- Kevin Augunas - producer
- Kevin Augunas - engineer
- Matt Wignall - engineer, producer (Tracks 2 & 8)
- Dave Sardy - mixer
- Ted Jensen - mastering
- Matt Maust - artwork
- Matt Wignall - photography

== Charts ==
=== Weekly charts ===
Chart (2007)	Peak position
Australian Albums (ARIA)	69
Belgian Albums (Ultratop Flanders)	43
Dutch Albums (Album Top 100)	96
French Albums (SNEP)	79
Scottish Albums (Official Charts)	33
UK Albums (Official Charts)	35
US Billboard 200	173
US Heatseekers Albums (Billboard)	4
US Independent Albums (Billboard)	15

=== Year-end charts ===
Chart (2007)	Position
US Top Independent Albums	37

== Release history ==
Region	Date	Format	Label	Ref.
United States	October 10, 2006	CD	Downtown	
Germany	February 2, 2007	Digital download, CD	V2	
Australia	February 5, 2007	Digital download, CD	V2	
United Kingdom	February 5, 2007	Digital download, CD	V2	
United States	May 12, 2007	Digital download	Downtown	
United Kingdom	March 3, 2014	Vinyl	Downtown	
