= We Used to Vacation =

EP by Cold War Kids
- Released: November 27, 2006
- Genre: Indie rock
- Length: 17:49
- Label: V2
- Producer: Kevin Augunas, Jason Martin, Cold War Kids

Cold War Kids chronology
Robbers & Cowards (2006)	We Used to Vacation (2006)	Loyalty to Loyalty (2008)

We Used to Vacation is the fourth EP by the American indie rock band Cold War Kids. It was released by V2 on November 27, 2006 on compact disc and vinyl. The title track (which is also the opening track of Robbers & Cowards) is told from the perspective of an alcoholic family man, telling of his struggle against his alcoholism in order to be responsible to his family. The line "I give a check to tax deductible charity organizations" is from the Bob Dylan track "Ballad of a Thin Man", from his Highway 61 Revisited album.

== Critical reception ==
NME were impressed by the track, praising the production and vocals and saying that the band had "enough flair, taste and soul for any educated heart in Britain."

== Track listing ==
No.	Title	Length
1.	"We Used To Vacation"	4:14
2.	"In Harmony In Silver"	3:38
3.	"Expensive Tastes"	5:02
4.	"Quiet, Please!"	4:55
