= Downtown Records =

American record label

- Founded: 2006
- Founder: Josh Deutsch; Terence Lam
- Distributors: Interscope Capitol Labels Group (US); Polydor Records (UK); The Orchard (EU); Universal Music Group (outside the US, the UK and Europe)
- Genre: Various
- Country of origin: U.S.
- Location: New York City
- Official website: downtownmusic.com

Downtown Records is an American record label based in New York City with offices in Los Angeles. Owned and operated by Josh Deutsch and Terence Lam, the label is distributed by Interscope Capitol Labels Group (formerly Geffen Records and Interscope Records) in the US, in the UK distributed by Polydor Records, and in the EU distributed by The Orchard.

Downtown's roster includes artists such as Nick Murphy, Brett Dennen, Electric Guest, Tei Shi, Goldroom and Tommy Genesis.

== History ==
The label was co-founded by Josh Deutsch and Terence Lam in 2006 and grew to become Downtown Music with publishing, licensing, music services and Songtrust. In 2013 Downtown Records was purchased outright by its original co-founders and now operates fully independent. The label's music was distributed by Sony Music's RED Distribution and Cooperative Music. It is now distributed by Interscope Records/Universal Music Group (now Geffen Records).

In addition to the sister label, Mercer Street Records, Downtown has label partnerships with Dim Mak Records, Fool's Gold Records and Mad Decent.

Downtown Records also operates Downtown Events – a festival and concert promotion company that produces The Downtown Music Festival.

== Roster ==
- The Academic
- Ant Beale
- Autre Ne Veut
- Bop English
- Brett Dennen
- Dawn Golden
- Devin Di Dakta
- Electric Guest
- Ex Cops
- Goldroom
- Houses
- Lawrence Rothman
- Lola Kirke
- Lorde Fredd33
- Mapei
- Miike Snow
- Nick Murphy (aka Chet Faker)
- Sammi Sanchez
- San Fermin
- Santigold
- Slow Magic
- Smino
- Tei Shi
- Tkay Maidza
- Tommy Genesis
- Vacationer

== Past roster ==
- Andrew Wyatt
- Amanda Blank
- Art Brut
- Big Time Rush
- Butter the Children
- Carla Bruni
- Chloē Laing
- Cold War Kids
- The Cranberries
- Crookers
- Cyndi Lauper
- Die Antwoord
- The Drums
- Duck Sauce
- Duke Dumont
- Eagles of Death Metal
- Gnarls Barkley
- Jonathan Wilson
- Justice
- Kid Sister
- Kate Earl
- Katie Herzig
- Lissy Trullie
- Major Lazer
- Marilyn Manson
- Mura Masa
- Mas Ysa
- Mos Def
- MSTRKRFT
- Neon Trees
- Penguin Prison
- Port St. Willow
- Say Lou Lou
- Scissor Sisters
- SomeKindaWonderful
- Spank Rock
- Wildcat! Wildcat!
- William Fitzsimmons
- White Denim
- YACHT

Mercer Street Records:

- Aṣa
- David Gray
- Femi Kuti
- Jessie Harris
- Kitty, Daisy & Lewis
- Meshell Ndegeocello
- Ozomatli
- William Fitzsimmons
