= The Masked Singer (American TV series) season 9 =

The Masked Singer
- Season 9
- Promotional poster for season nine, featuring "Doll", "Axolotl", "Moose", and "French Hen"
- Starring: Robin Thicke; Jenny McCarthy Wahlberg; Ken Jeong; Nicole Scherzinger
- Hosted by: Nick Cannon
- No. of contestants: 21
- Winner: Bishop Briggs as "Medusa"
- Runner-up: David Archuleta as "Macaw"
- No. of episodes: 14

Release
- Original network: Fox
- Original release: February 15 – May 17, 2023

Season chronology
- ← Previous; Season 8 Next → Season 10

The ninth season of the American television series The Masked Singer premiered on Fox on February 15, 2023, and concluded on May 17, 2023. The season was won by singer Bishop Briggs as "Medusa", with singer David Archuleta finishing second as "Macaw".

== Panelists and host ==
Season 9 panelists and host

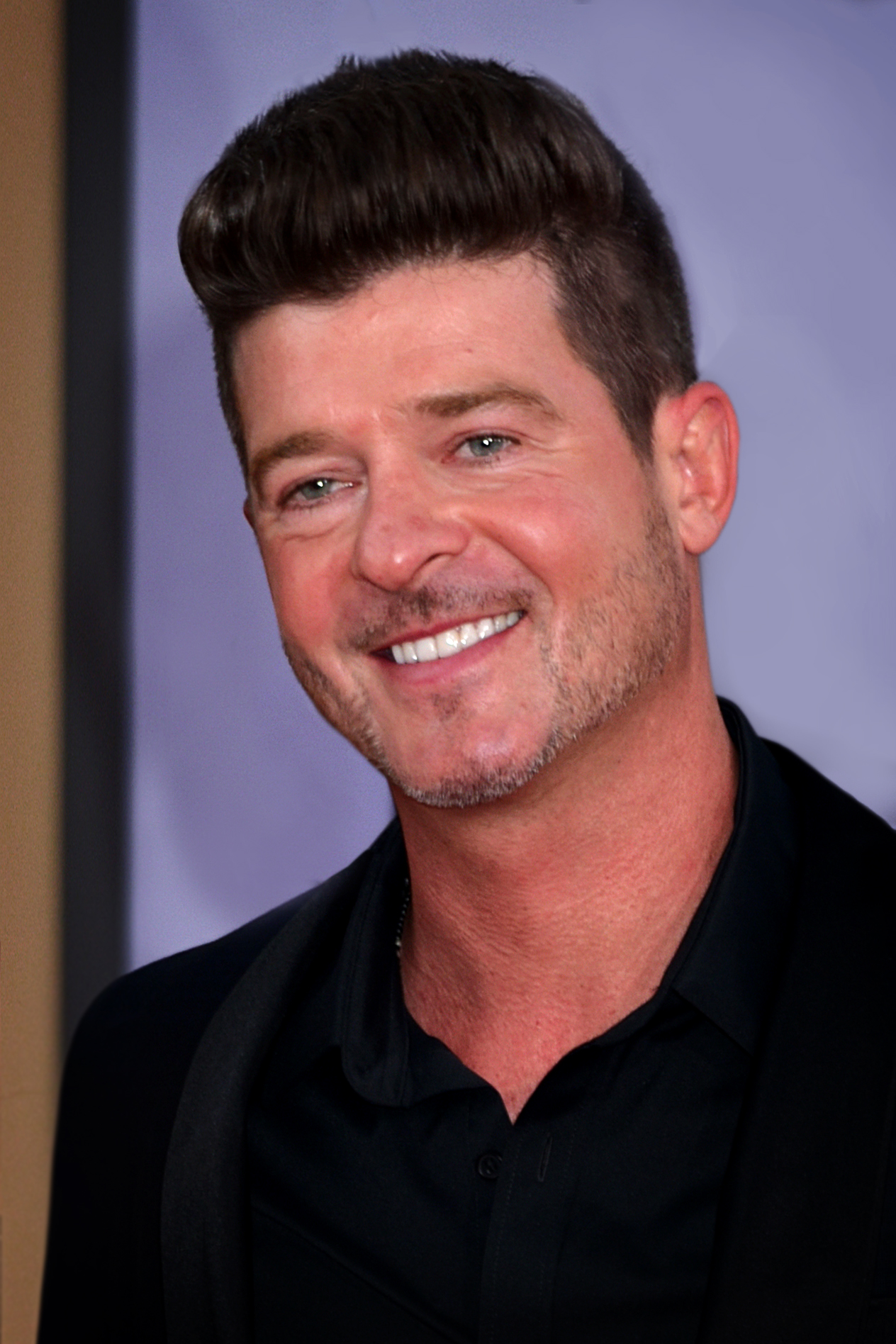
Robin Thicke

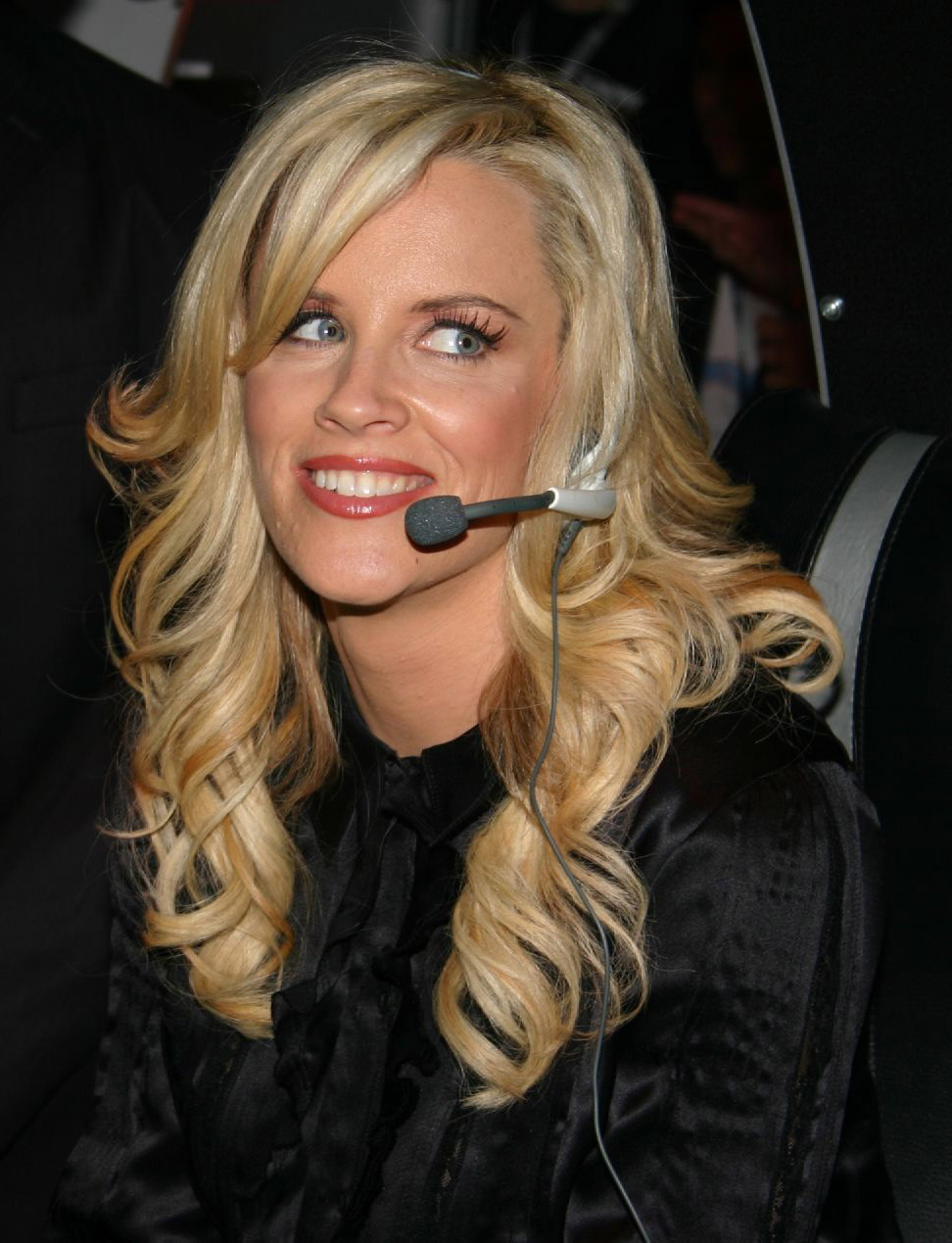
Jenny McCarthy Wahlberg

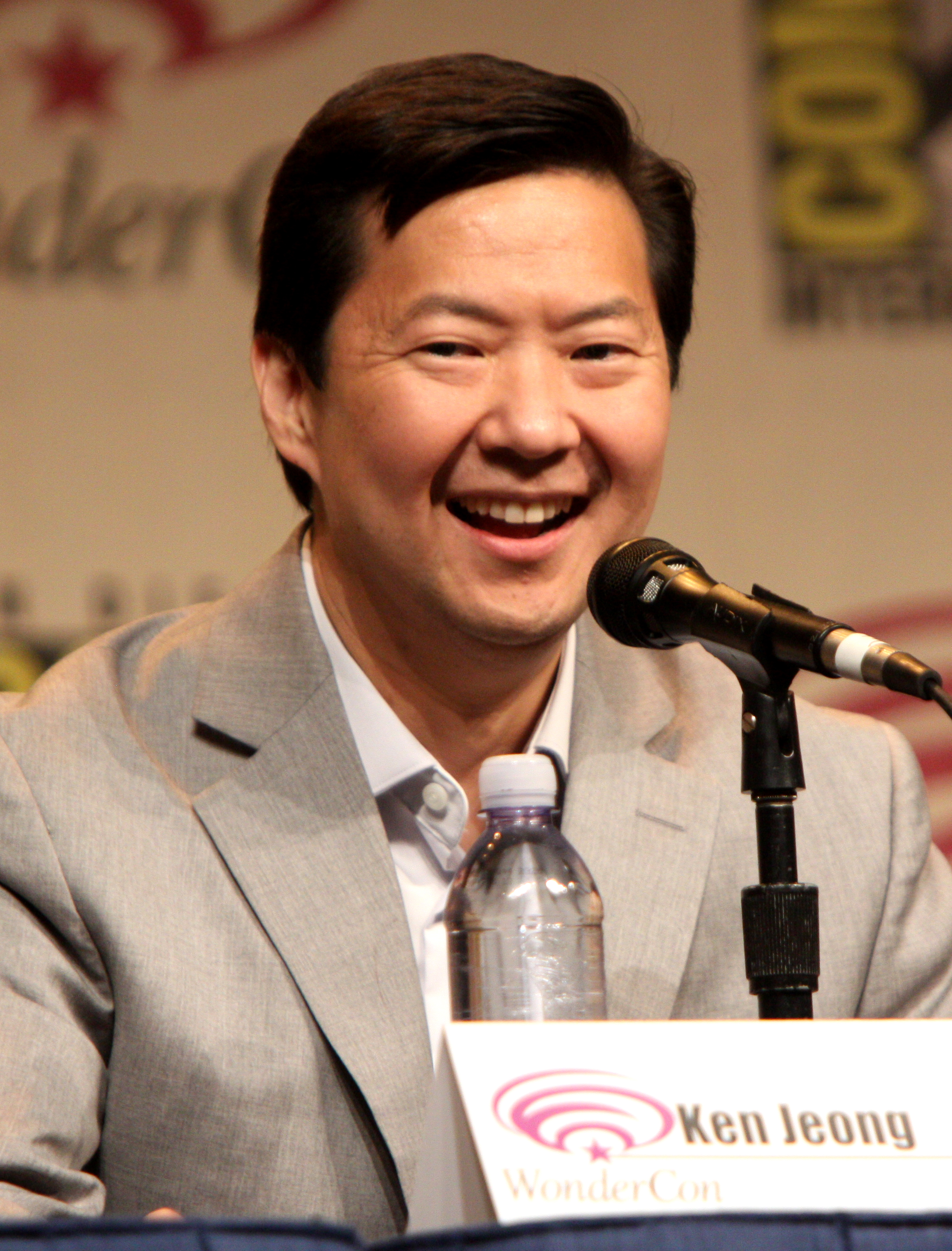
Ken Jeong

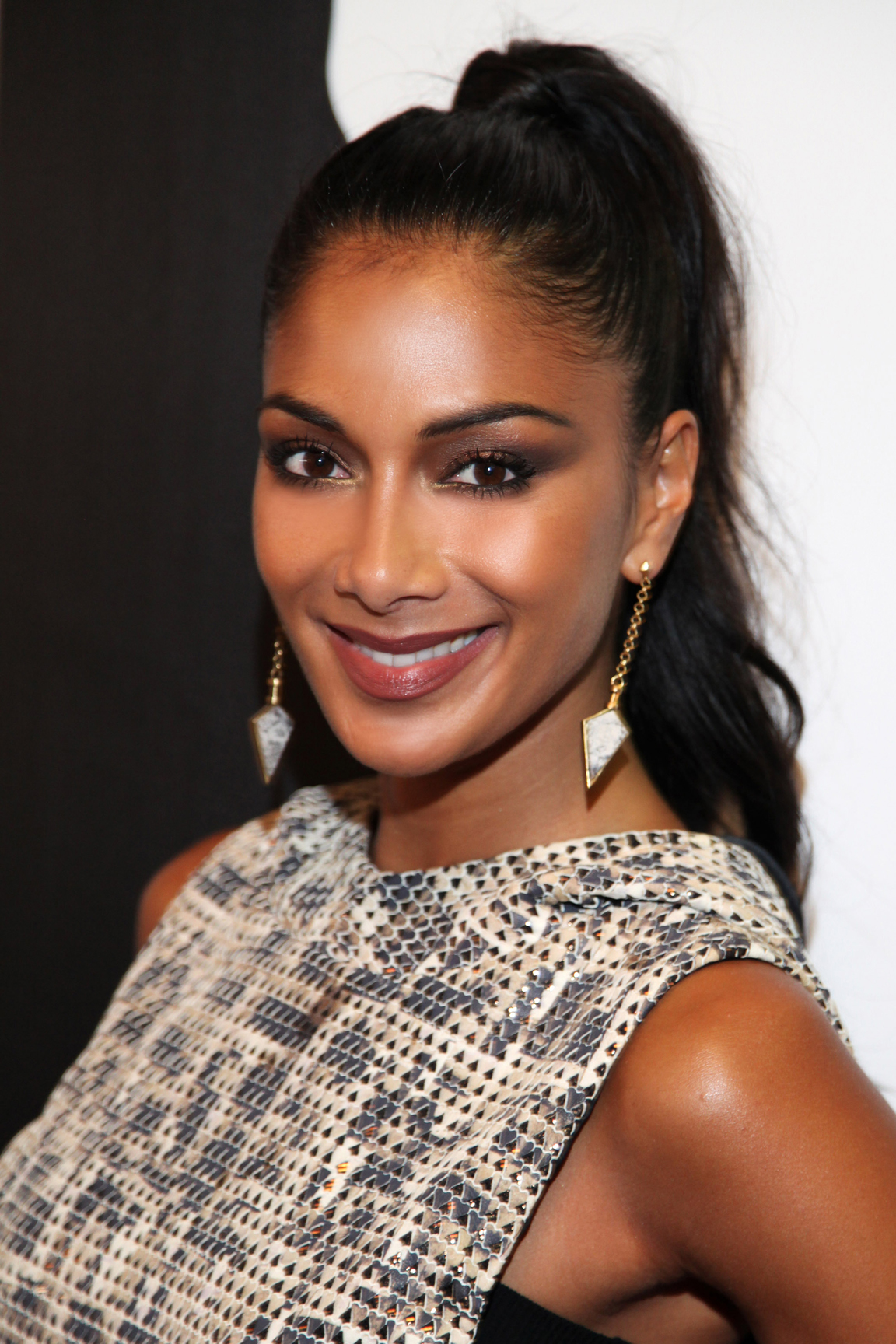
Nicole Scherzinger

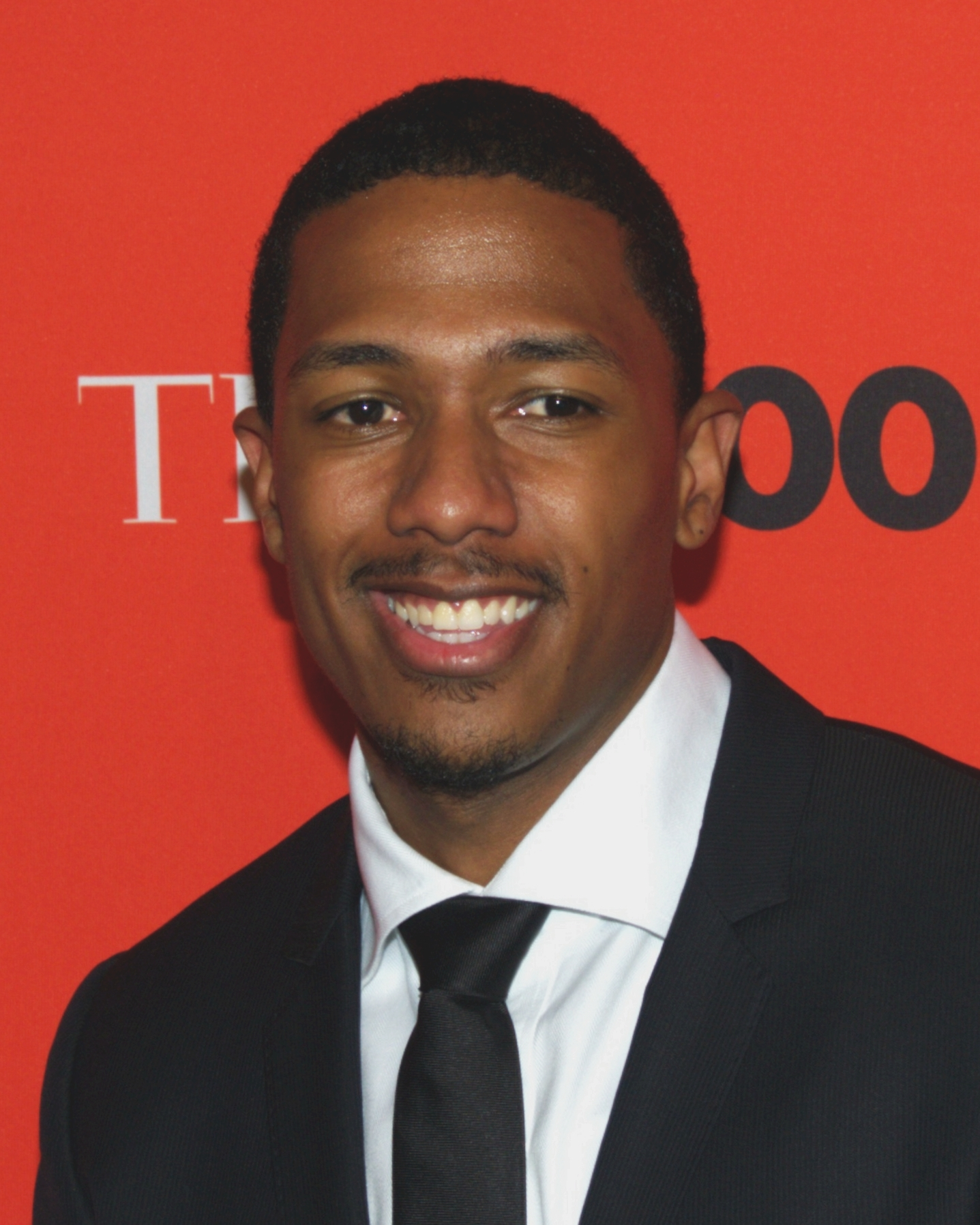
Nick Cannon

Nick Cannon, singer-songwriter Robin Thicke, television and radio personality Jenny McCarthy Wahlberg, actor and comedian Ken Jeong, and recording artist Nicole Scherzinger all return as host and panelists.

The second episode included Nick Viall and Shangela as additional guests, the third episode included Luann de Lesseps and Theresa Caputo as additional guests, the fourth episode included Helen Mirren, Zachary Levi, and Jim Lee as additional guests with Jennifer Nettles appearing in a post-credit gag, the fifth episode featured Nettles as a guest panelist, with Elmo, Big Bird, Cookie Monster, Oscar the Grouch, Grover, Count von Count, Abby Cadabby, and Elmo's puppy Tango as additional guests, the sixth episode included Bill Engvall, Robert Woods, and Deana Carter as additional guests, the seventh episode included Young MC, Donnie Wahlberg (who portrayed "Cluedle-Doo" during the fifth season), Erik Estrada, and Charlene Tilton as additional guests, and the ninth episode included Daphne Zuniga and Mike Massimino as additional guests.

Buffalo Bills safety Damar Hamlin appeared as a guest in the fifth episode along with his younger brother, Damir. The episode was filmed in January 2023, a few weeks after his cardiac arrest medical incident.

== Production ==
The season is formatted similar to its predecessor, featuring three contestants in each episode, with one eliminated mid-show and taken to the VIP section and the other two battling it out in a Battle Royale. A champion is crowned at the end of each episode who then moves on to the following episode, with the other singer in the top two unmasking. However, it also introduces a gimmick known as the "Ding Dong Keep It On" bell, which allows a panelist to save a singer from elimination. The bell can only be used once per group. As a result, there was a special episode where those saved by the "Ding Dong Keep It On" bell compete for a second chance to stay in the competition.

The season also features the return of themed nights, a gimmick introduced in the previous season. The season includes themes such as "Opening Night", "ABBA", "New York", "DC Superhero", "Sesame Street", "80s Night", "Country", "Movie Night", "Space", and “British Invasion”.

The twelfth episode of the season ended with a dedication for TV host Jerry Springer who died on April 27, 2023. Springer portrayed "Beetle" in the previous season.

== Contestants ==
The contestants in this season are reported to have a combined 95,231,000 records sold, 28 Emmy nominations, 26 books, 10 gold albums, six Grammy wins, five lifetime achievement awards, five medals, four Golden Globe nominations, four stars on the Hollywood Walk of Fame, and two Tony Award nominations.

One mask, "French Hen", was revealed in promotional material prior to the airing of the season, but did not participate in the season. Although nothing has been officially revealed about the celebrity participant, Variety has reported that a celebrity exited the season after testing positive for COVID-19, which ultimately led to Debbie Gibson's participation.

Results
| Stage name | Celebrity | Occupation(s) | Episodes | | | | | | | | | | | | |
| Stage name | Celebrity | Occupation(s) | 1 | 2 | 3 | 4 | 5 | 6 | 7 | 8 | 9 | 11 | 12 | 13 | 14 |
| Stage name | Celebrity | Occupation(s) | Round 1 | | | Round 2 | | | Round 3 | | | 11 | 12 | 13 | 14 |
|---|---|---|---|---|---|---|---|---|---|---|---|---|---|---|---|
| Medusa | Bishop Briggs | Singer | WIN | WIN | KEPT (Note: While in the middle of their unmasking, panelist Nicole Scherzinger used the "Ding Dong Keep It On" bell to save Medusa from elimination, allowing the portrayer to keep their mask on and continue in the competition.) | | | | | | | WIN | SAFE | SAFE | WINNER |
| Macaw | David Archuleta | Singer | | | | | | WIN | | | | | SAFE | SAFE | RUNNER-UP |
| California Roll | Pentatonix | A capella group | | | WIN | | | | | | | | SAFE | OUT | |
| UFO | Olivia Culpo | Model/internet personality | | | | | | | | | WIN | | OUT | | |
| Gargoyle | Keenan Allen | NFL player | | | | KEPT (Note: While in the middle of their unmasking, panelist Jenny McCarthy used the "Ding Dong Keep It On" bell to save Gargoyle from elimination, allowing the portrayer to keep their mask on and continue in the competition.) | | | | | | OUT | | | |
| Mantis | Lou Diamond Phillips | Actor | | | | | | | | KEPT (Note: While in the middle of their unmasking, panelist Robin Thicke used the "Ding Dong Keep It On" bell to save Mantis from elimination, allowing the portrayer to keep their mask on and continue in the competition.) | | OUT | | | |
| Lamp | Melissa Joan Hart | Actor | | | | | | | | | OUT | | | | |
| Dandelion | Alicia Witt | Actor/singer | | | | | | | | WIN | OUT | | | | |
| Doll | Dee Snider | Singer | | | | | | | WIN | OUT | | | | | |
| Scorpio | Christine Quinn | TV personality | | | | | | | OUT | | | | | | |
| Moose | George Wendt | Actor/comedian | | | | | | | OUT | | | | | | |
| Fairy | Holly Robinson Peete | Actor/singer | | | | | WIN | OUT | | | | | | | |
| Axolotl | Alexa Bliss | Professional wrestler | | | | | | OUT | | | | | | | |
| Jackalope | Lele Pons | Internet personality | | | | | OUT | | | | | | | | |
| Squirrel | Malin Akerman | Actor | | | | WIN | OUT | | | | | | | | |
| Wolf | Michael Bolton (Note: Bolton previously appeared in the sixth season as a special guest.) | Singer | | | | OUT | | | | | | | | | |
| Polar Bear | Grandmaster Flash | DJ/rapper | | | OUT | | | | | | | | | | |
| Night Owl | Debbie Gibson | Singer | | OUT | | | | | | | | | | | |
| Rock Lobster | Howie Mandel | Comedian/TV personality | | OUT | | | | | | | | | | | |
| Mustang | Sara Evans | Singer | OUT | | | | | | | | | | | | |
| Gnome | Dick Van Dyke | Actor/comedian | OUT | | | | | | | | | | | | |

- WIN The masked singer won with their performance and advanced in the competition.
- KEPT The masked singer was saved from elimination by a panelist using the "Ding Dong Keep It On" bell.
- SAFE The masked singer was safe from elimination.
- OUT The masked singer was eliminated from the competition and unmasked.
- The masked singer did not perform.
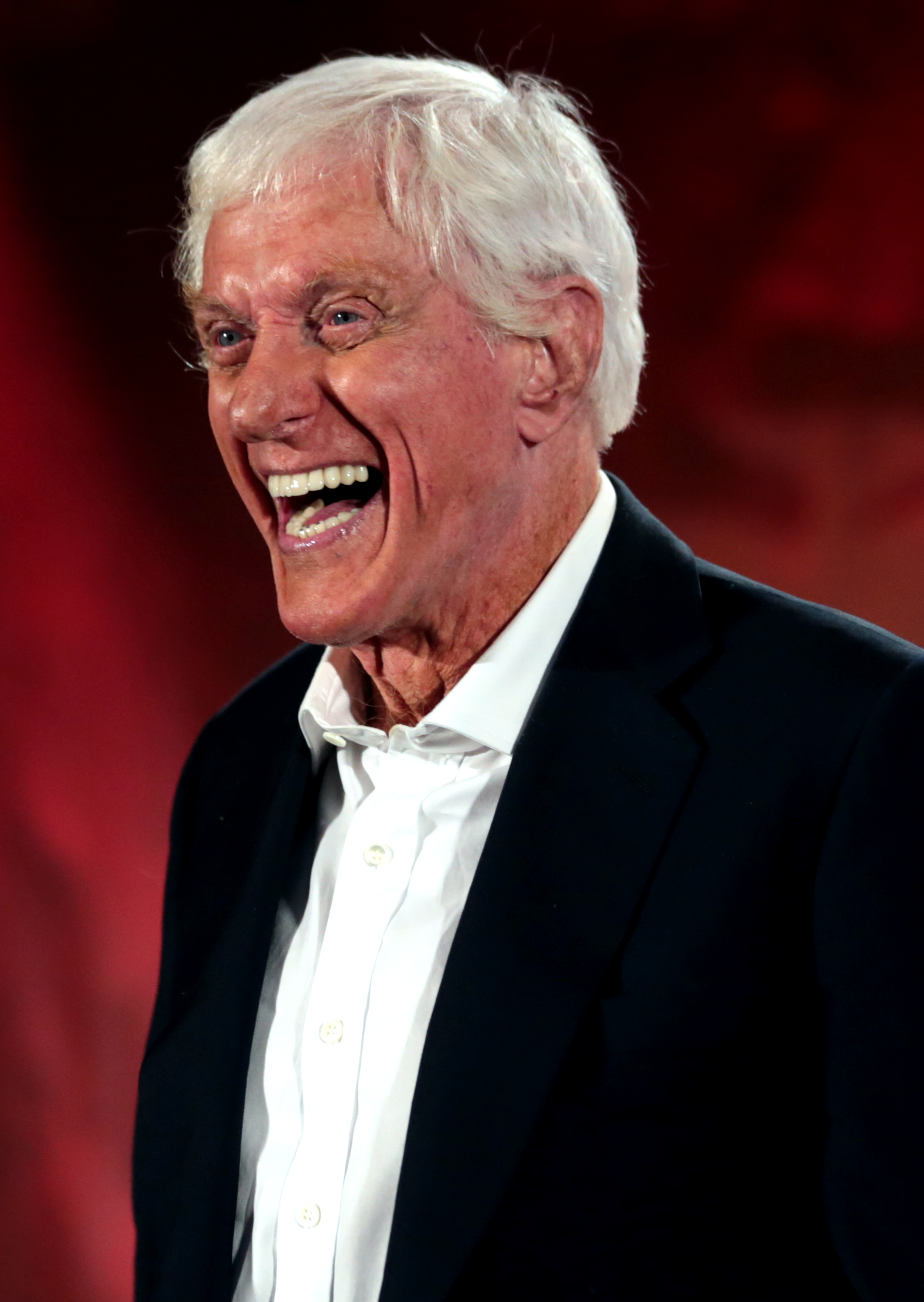
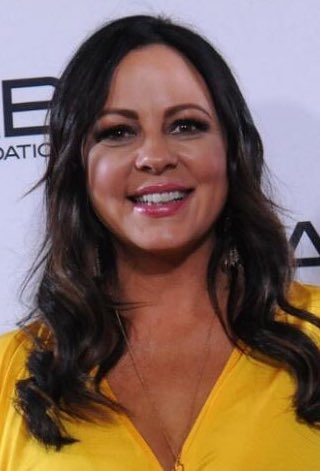
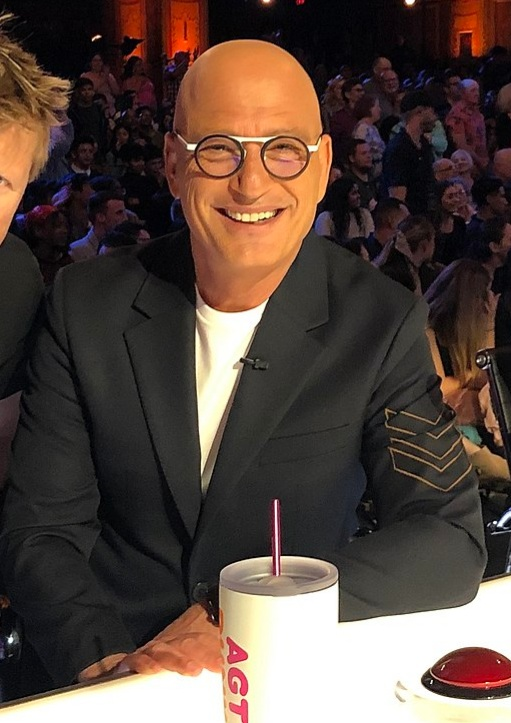
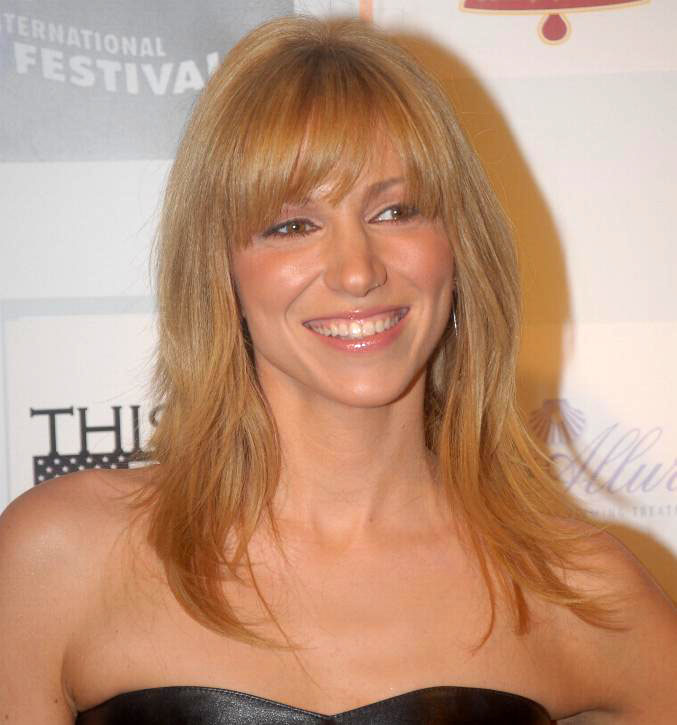
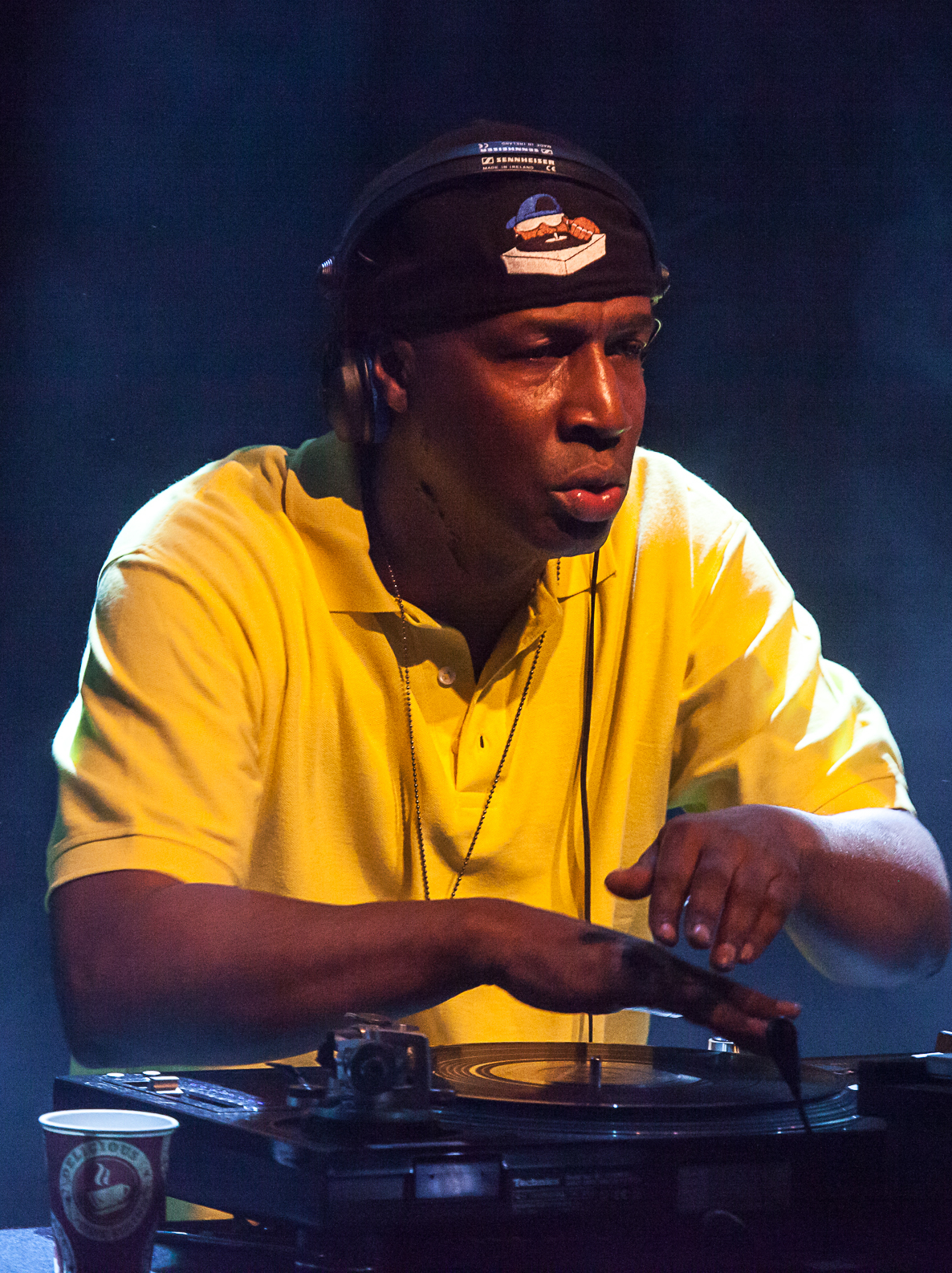
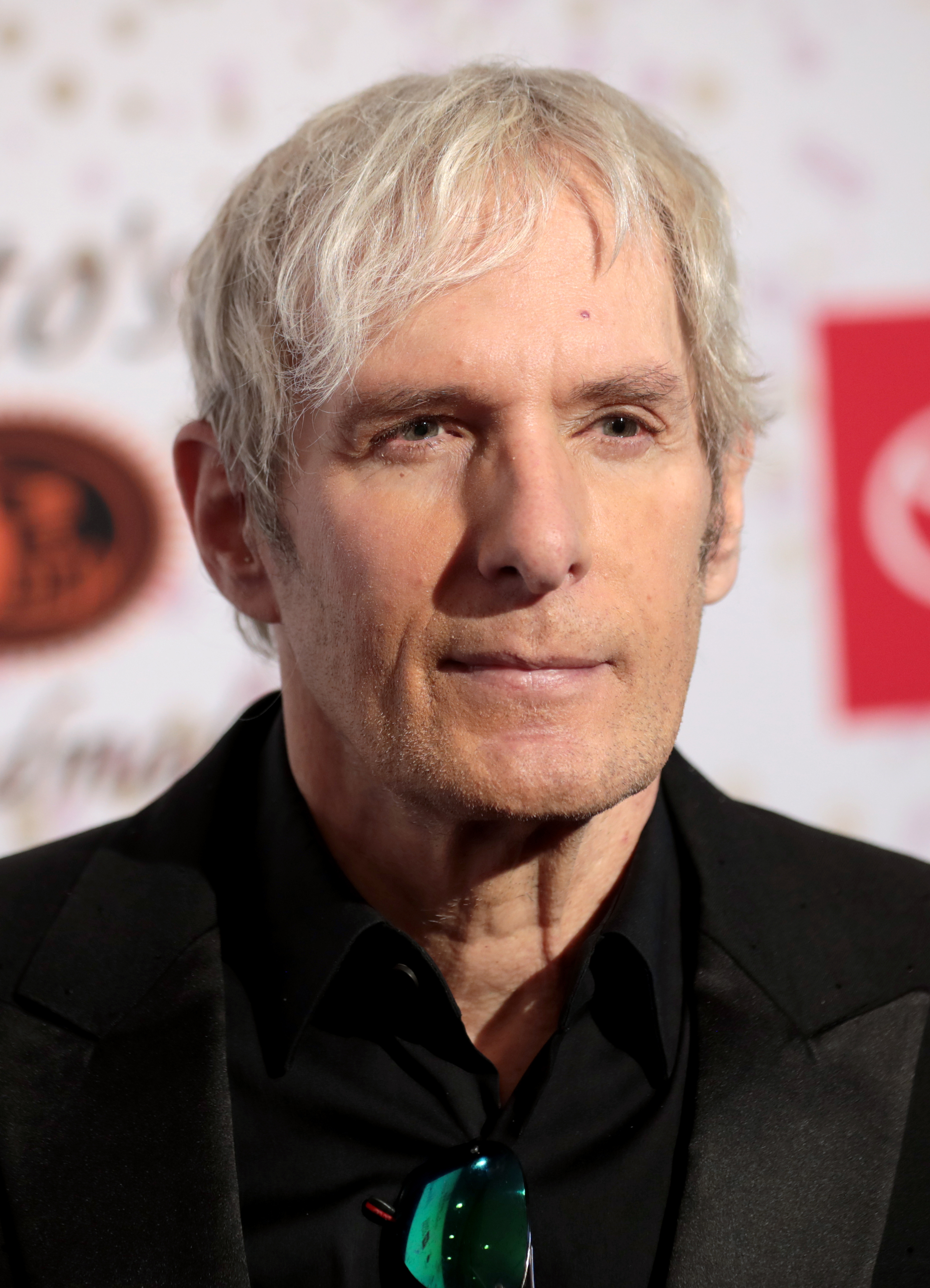
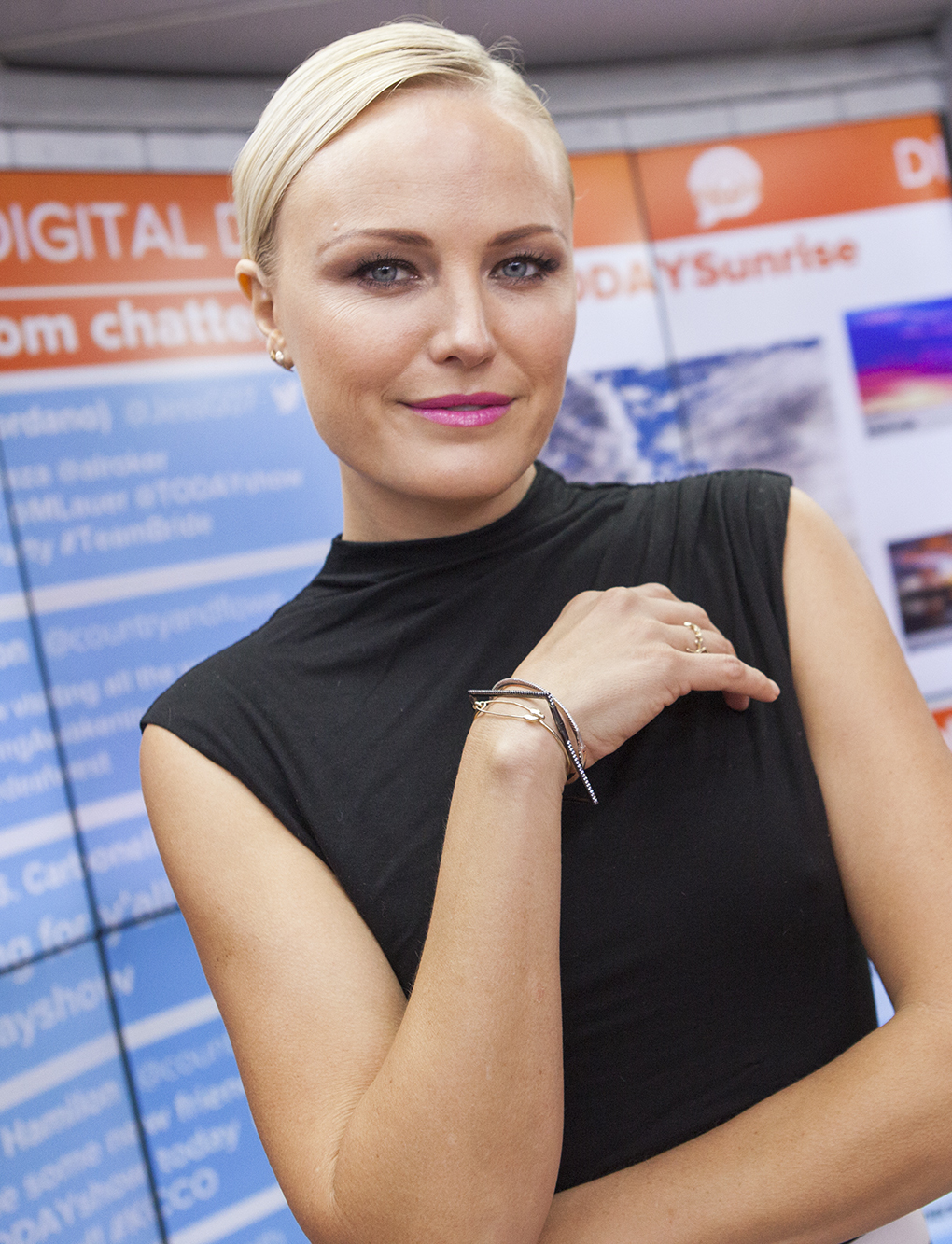
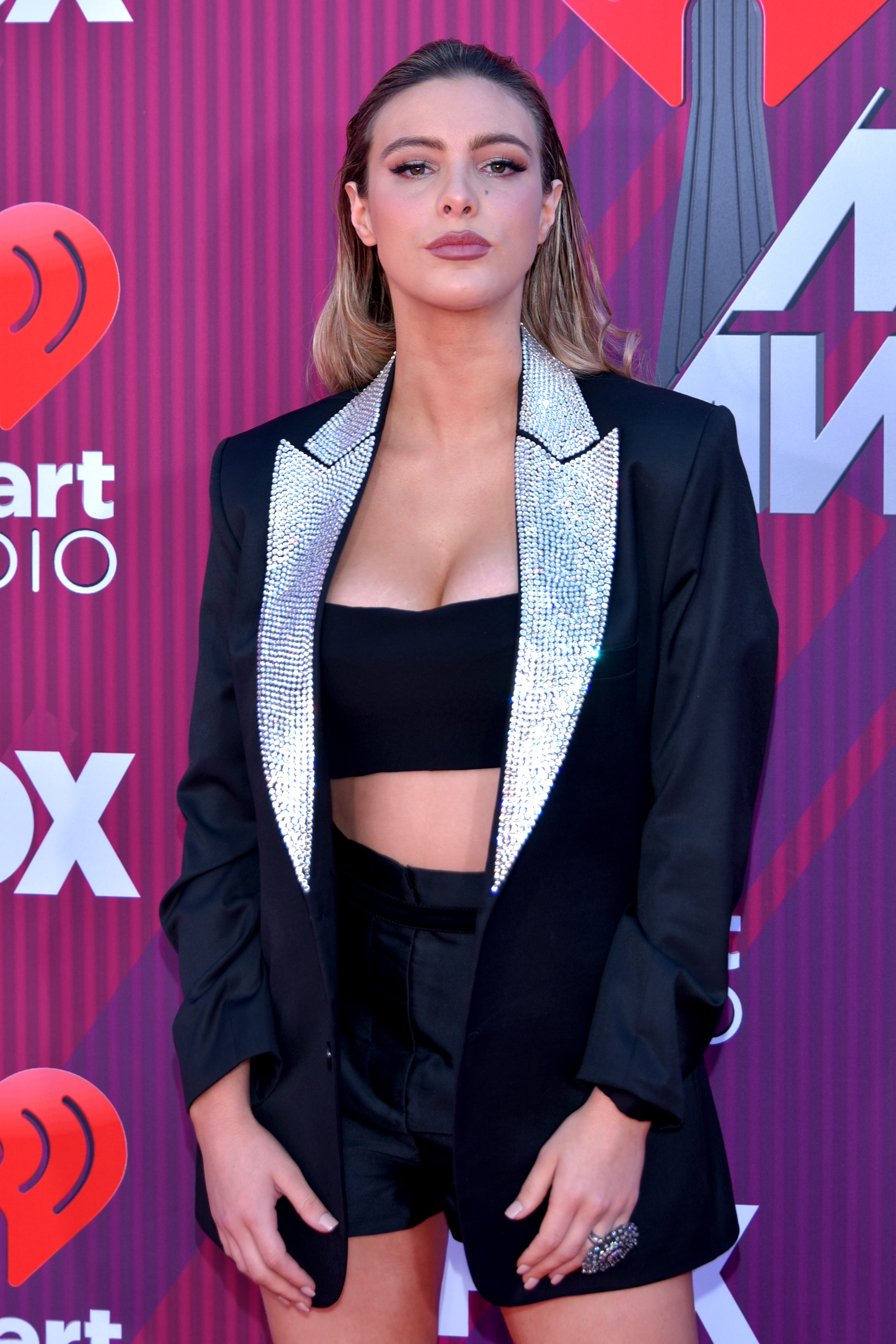
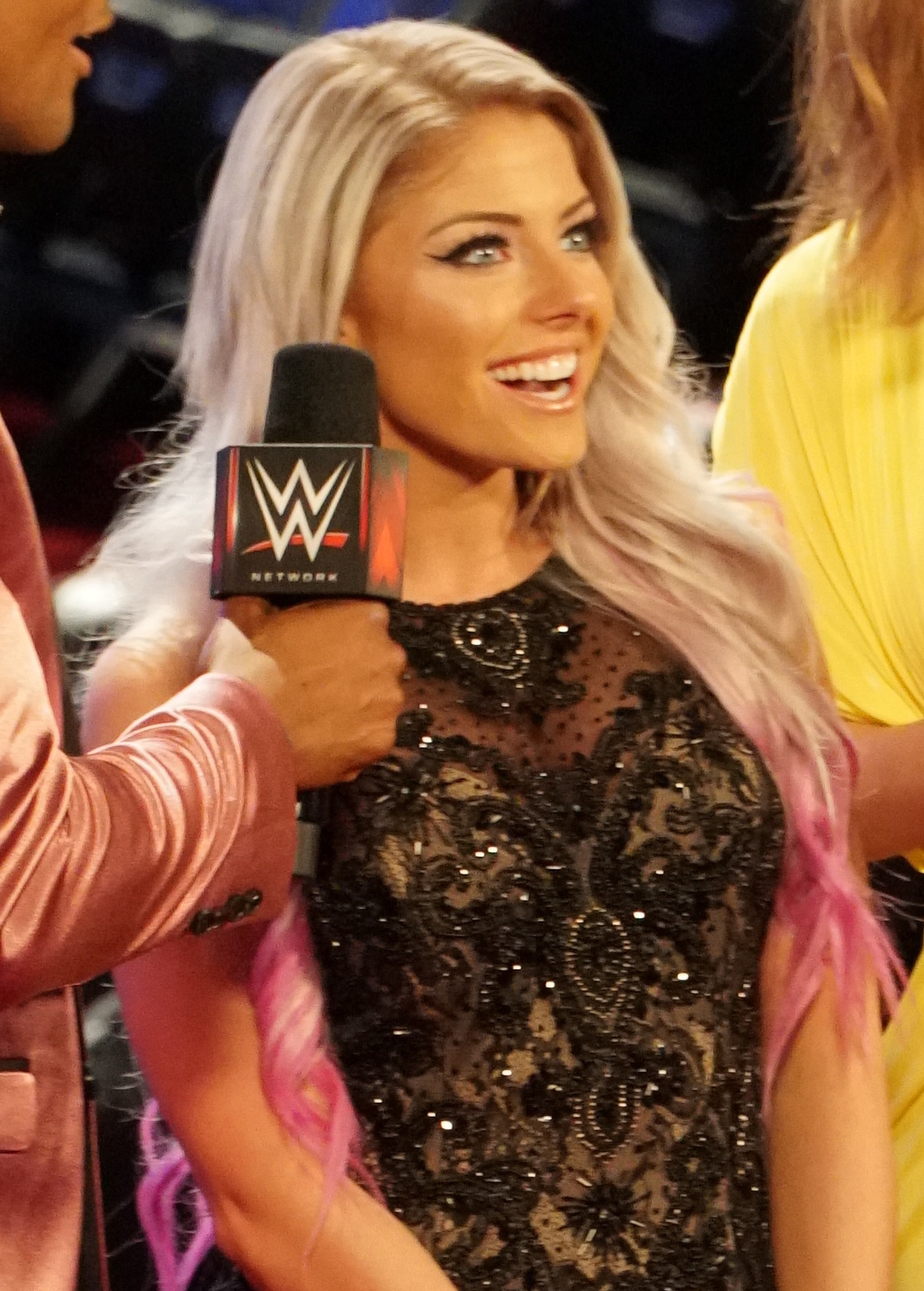
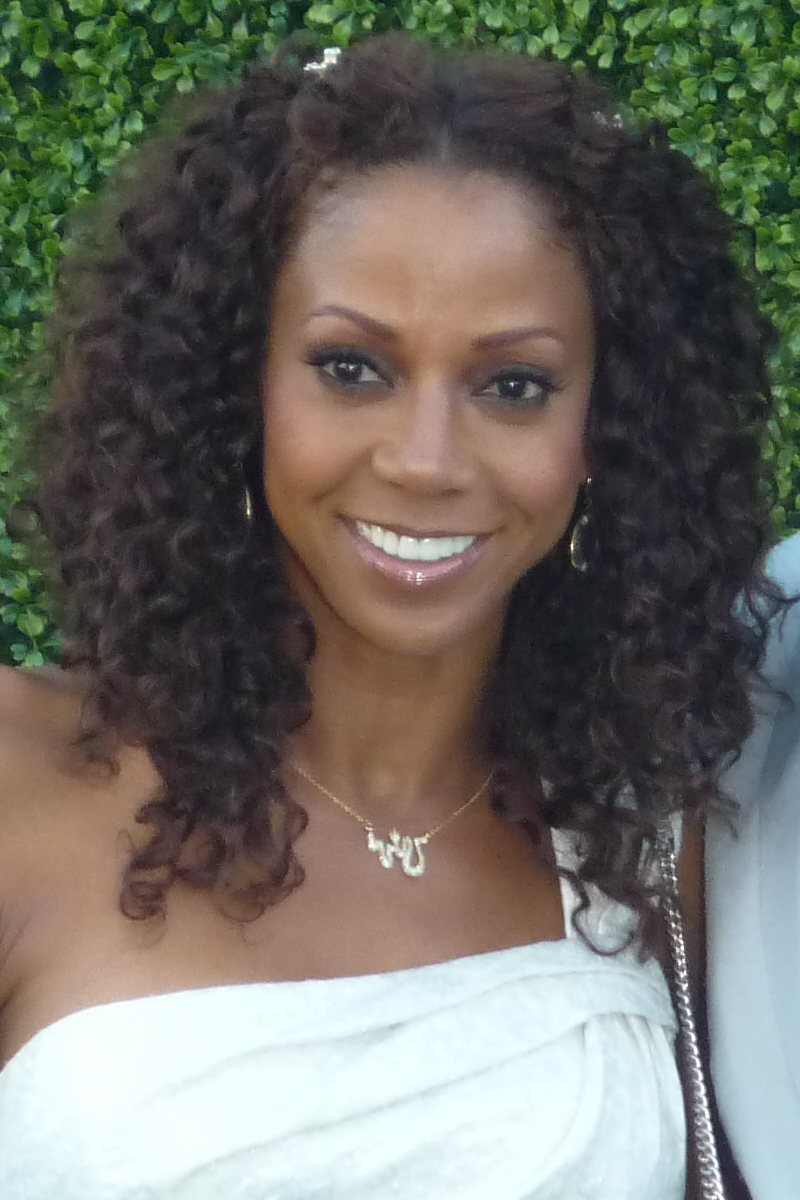
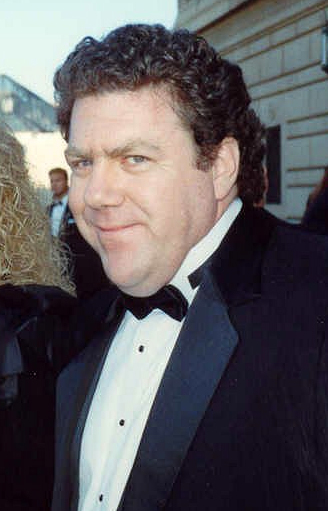
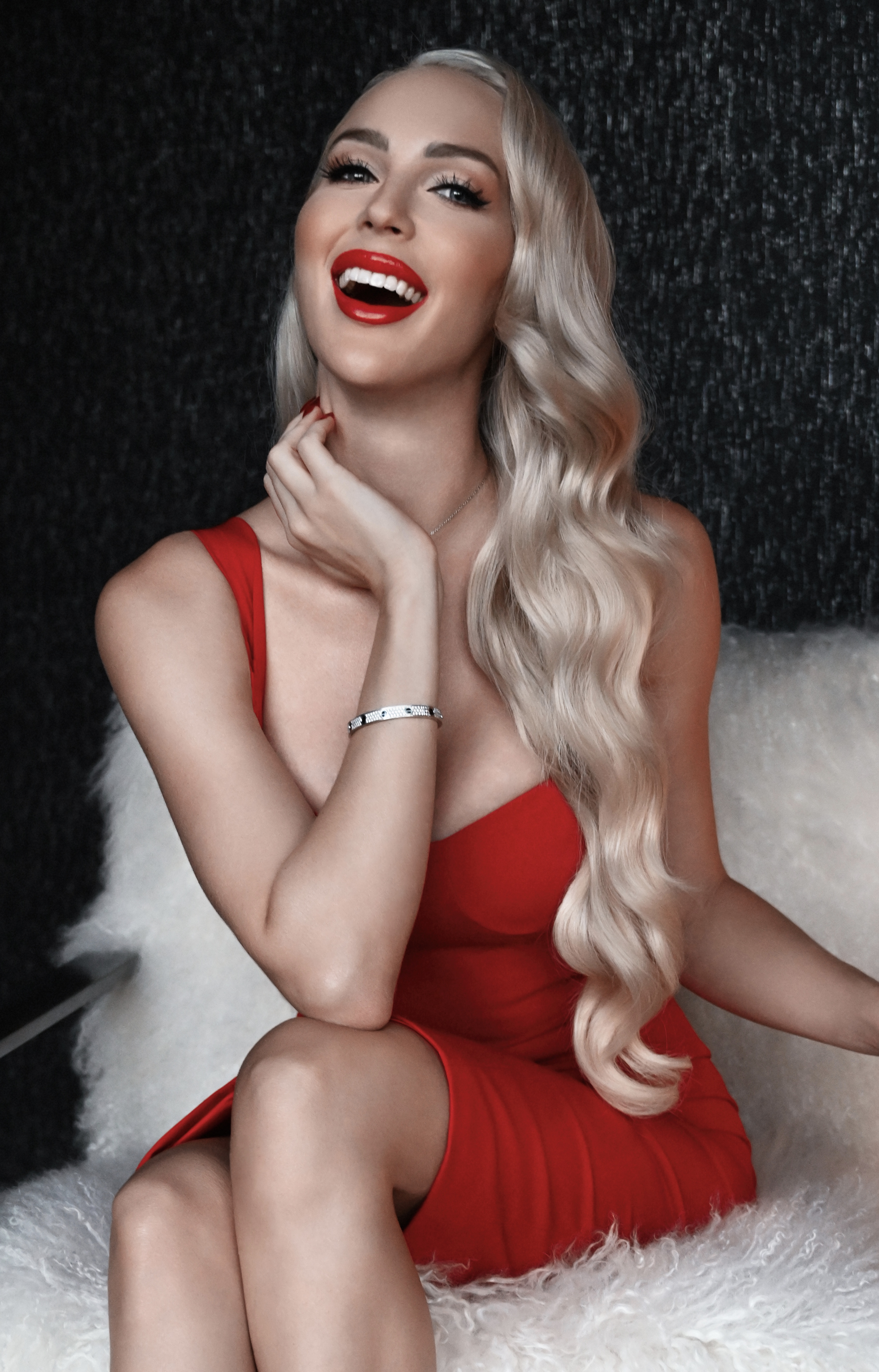
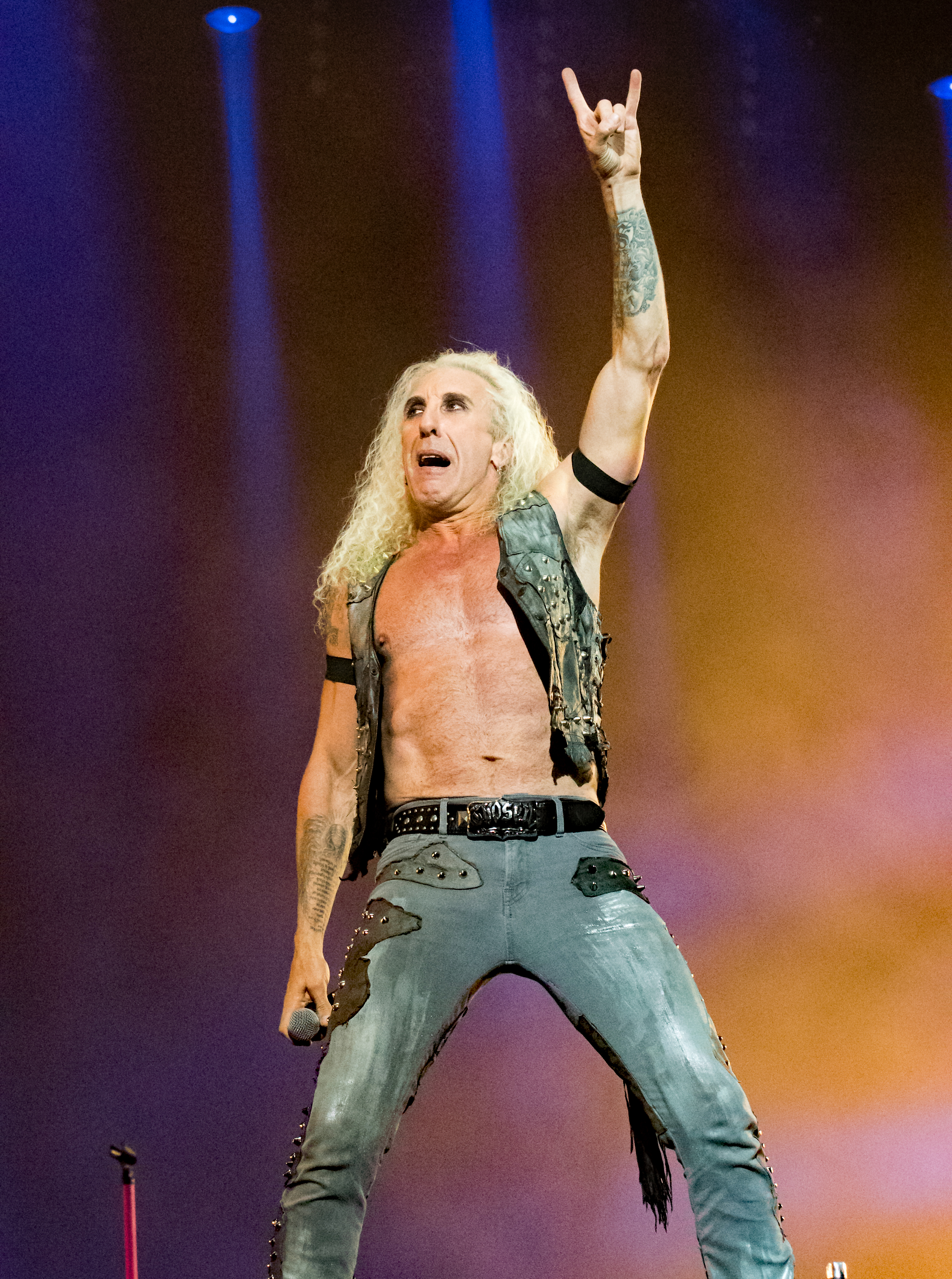
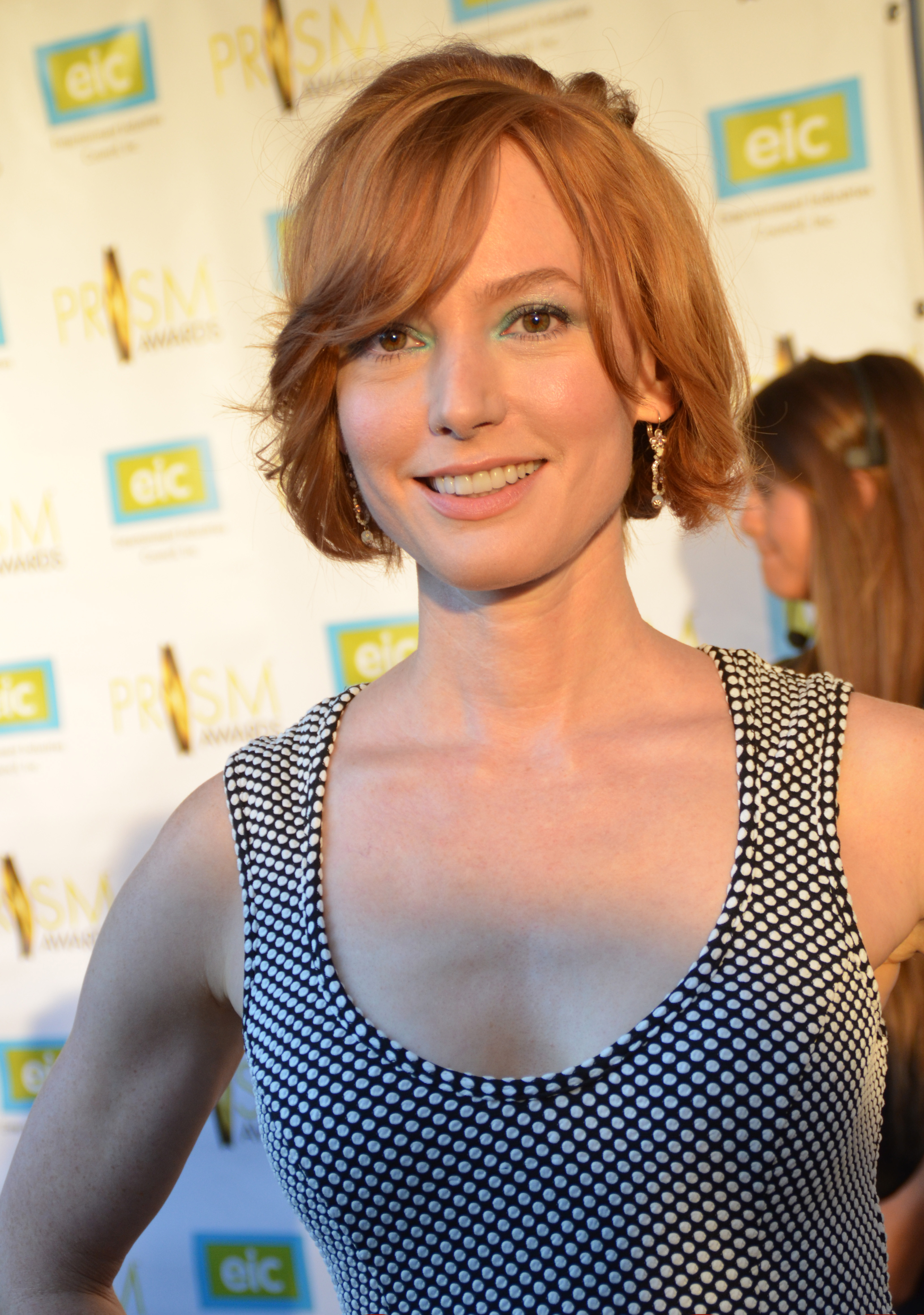
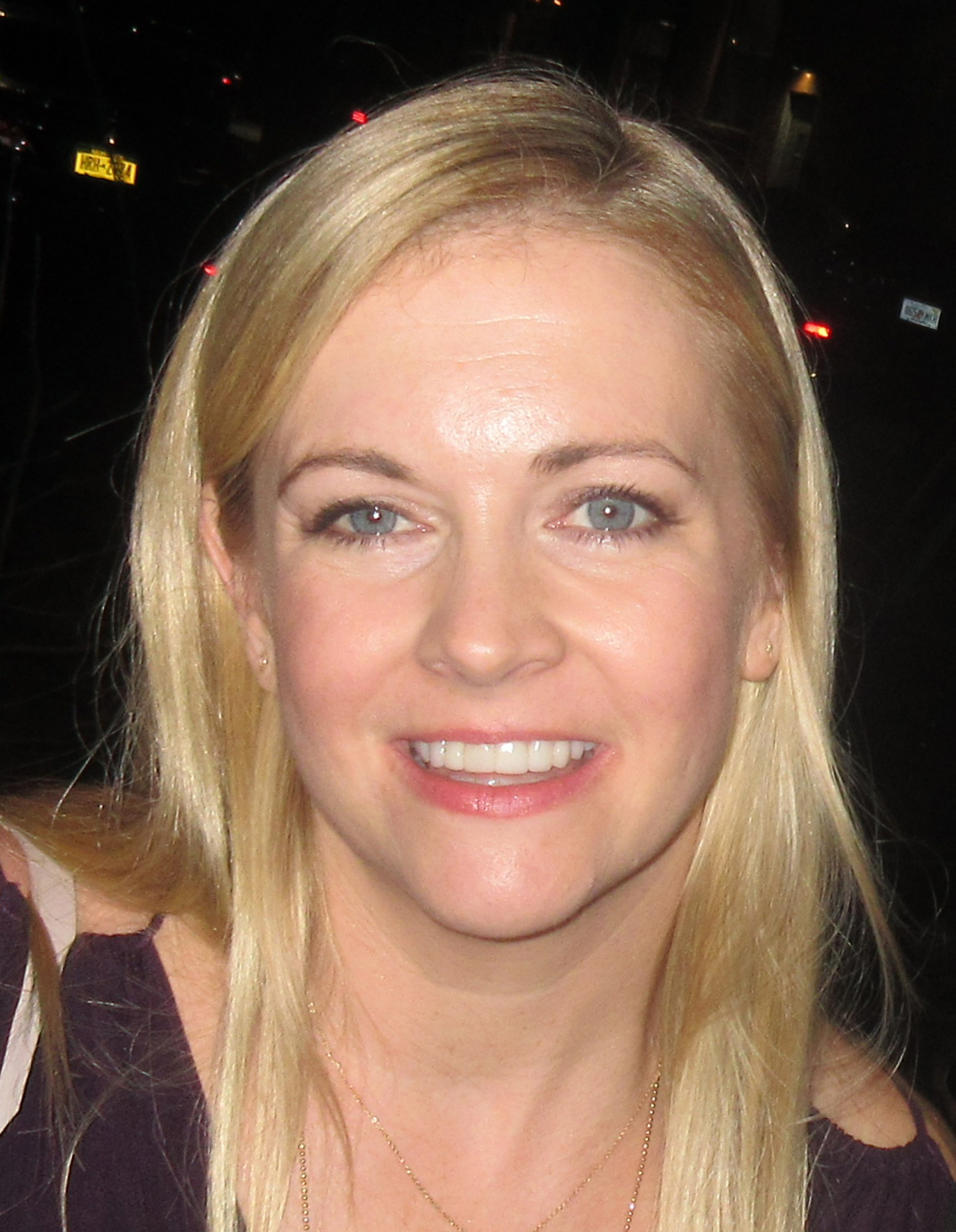
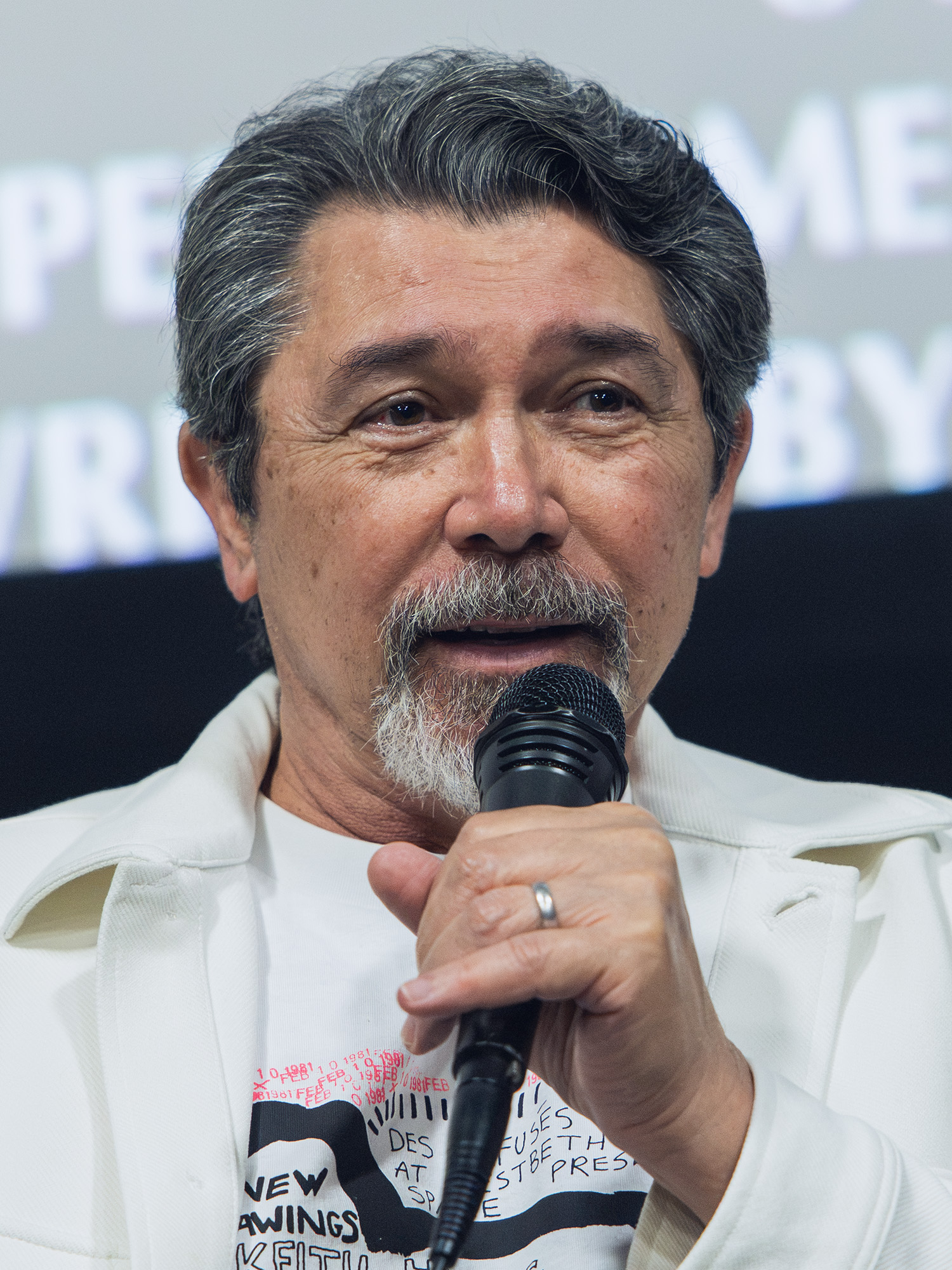
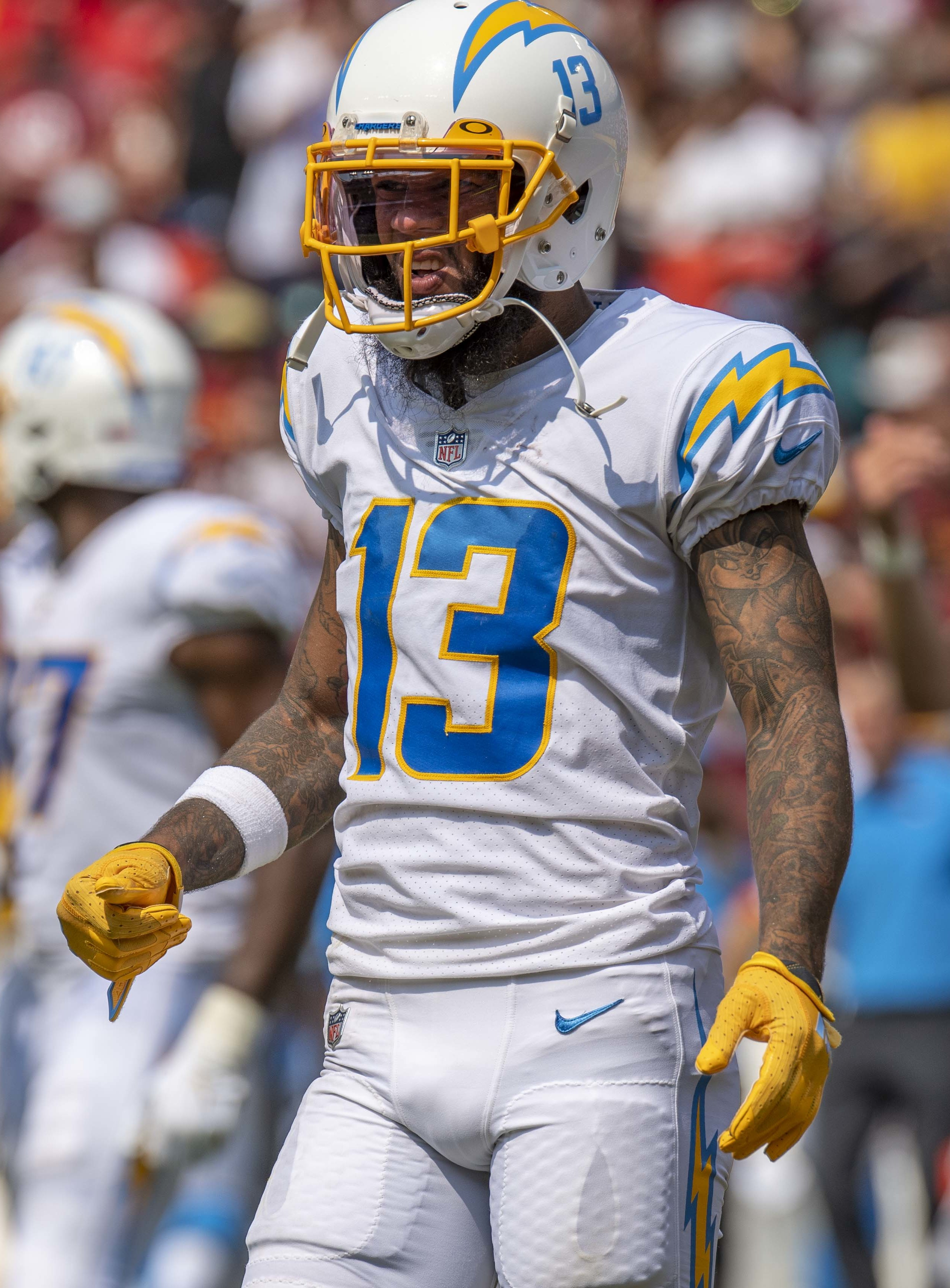
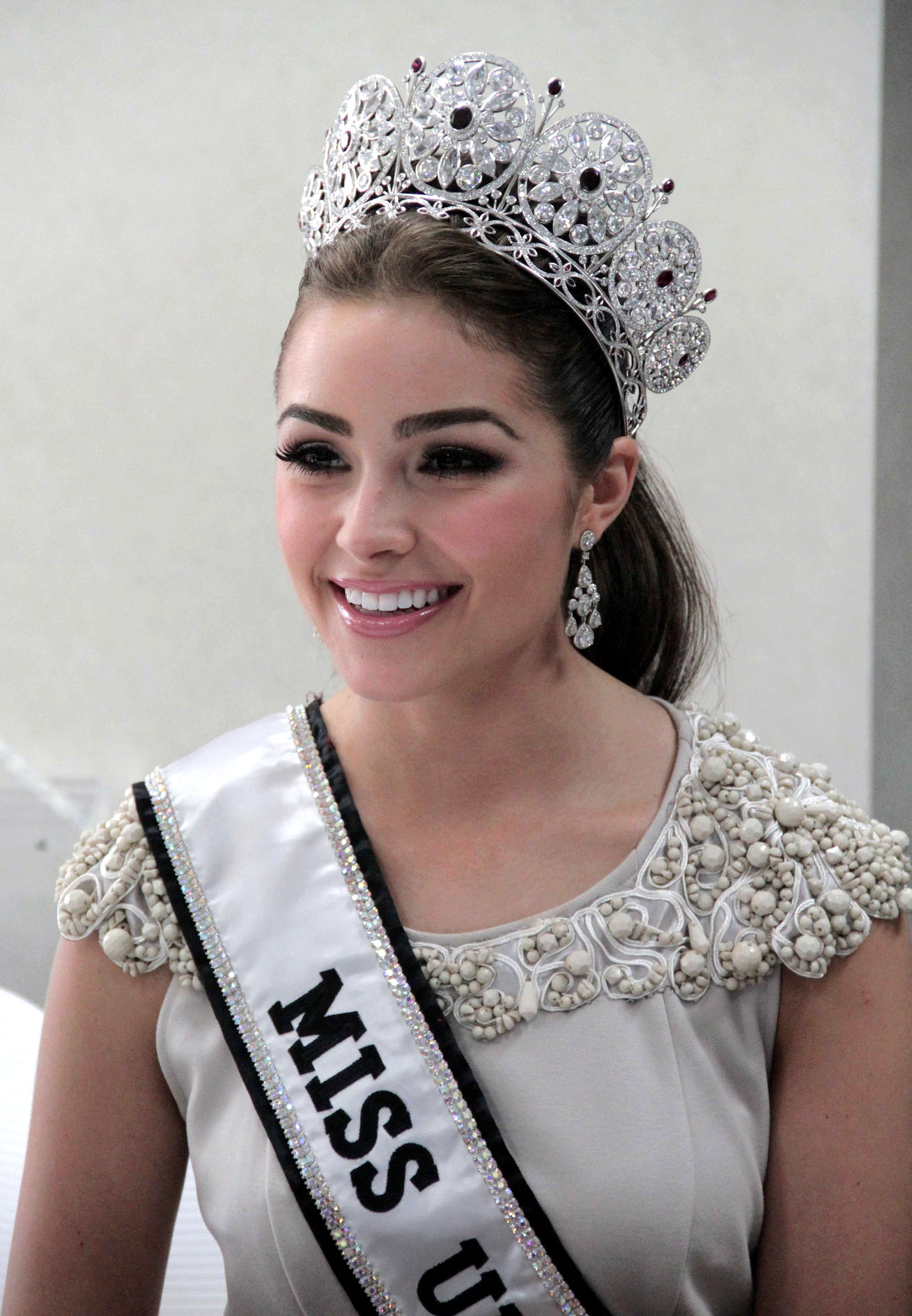
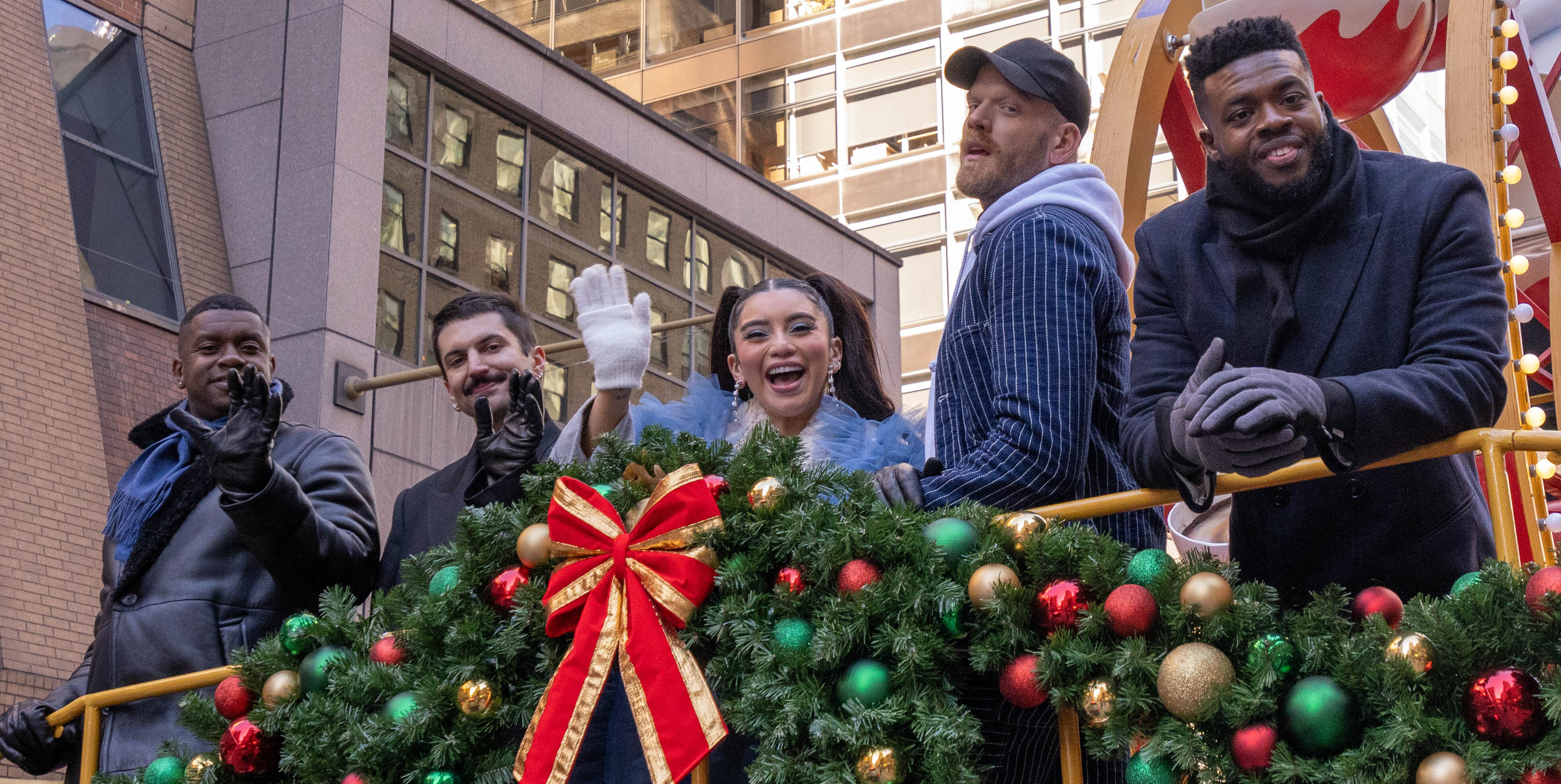
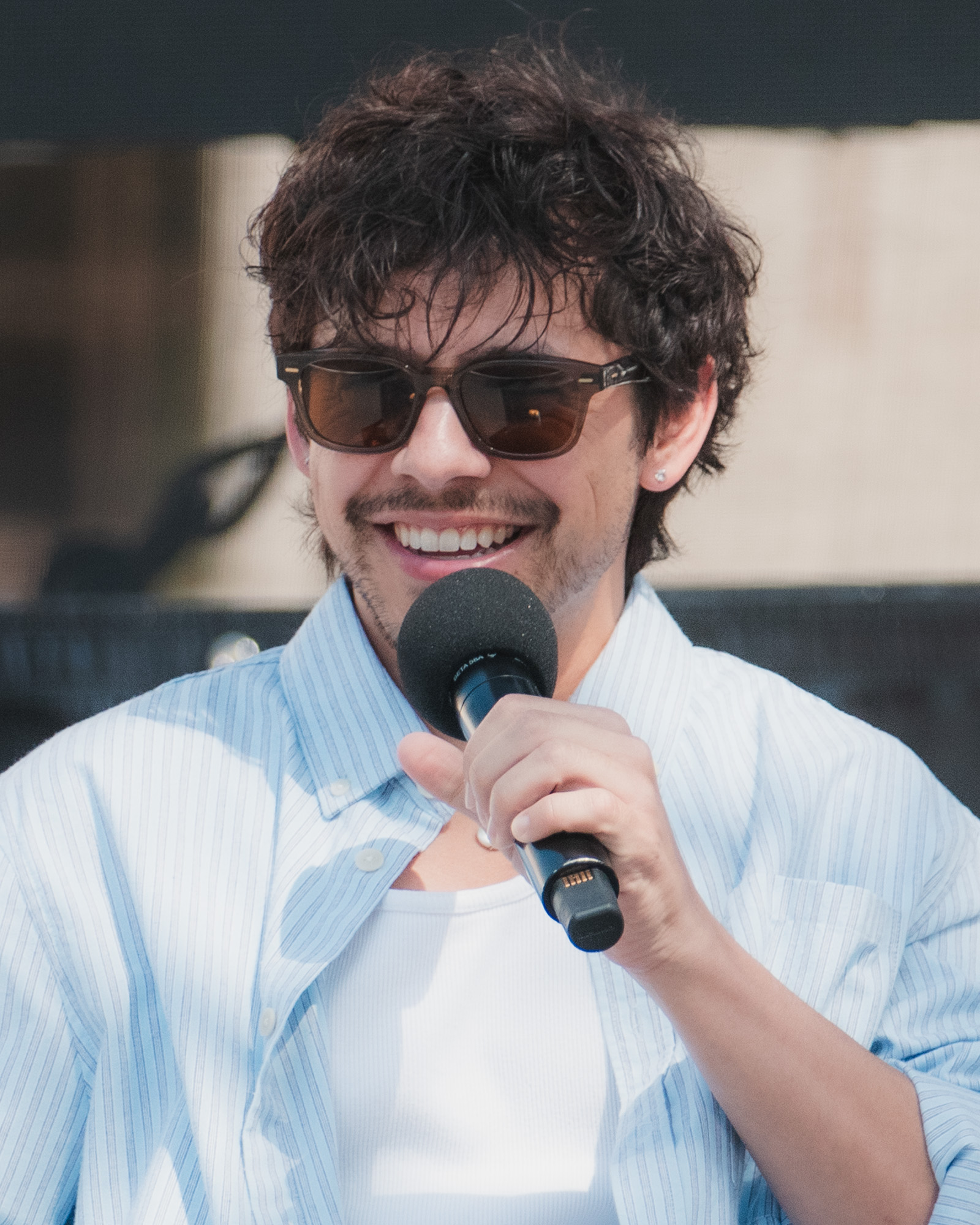
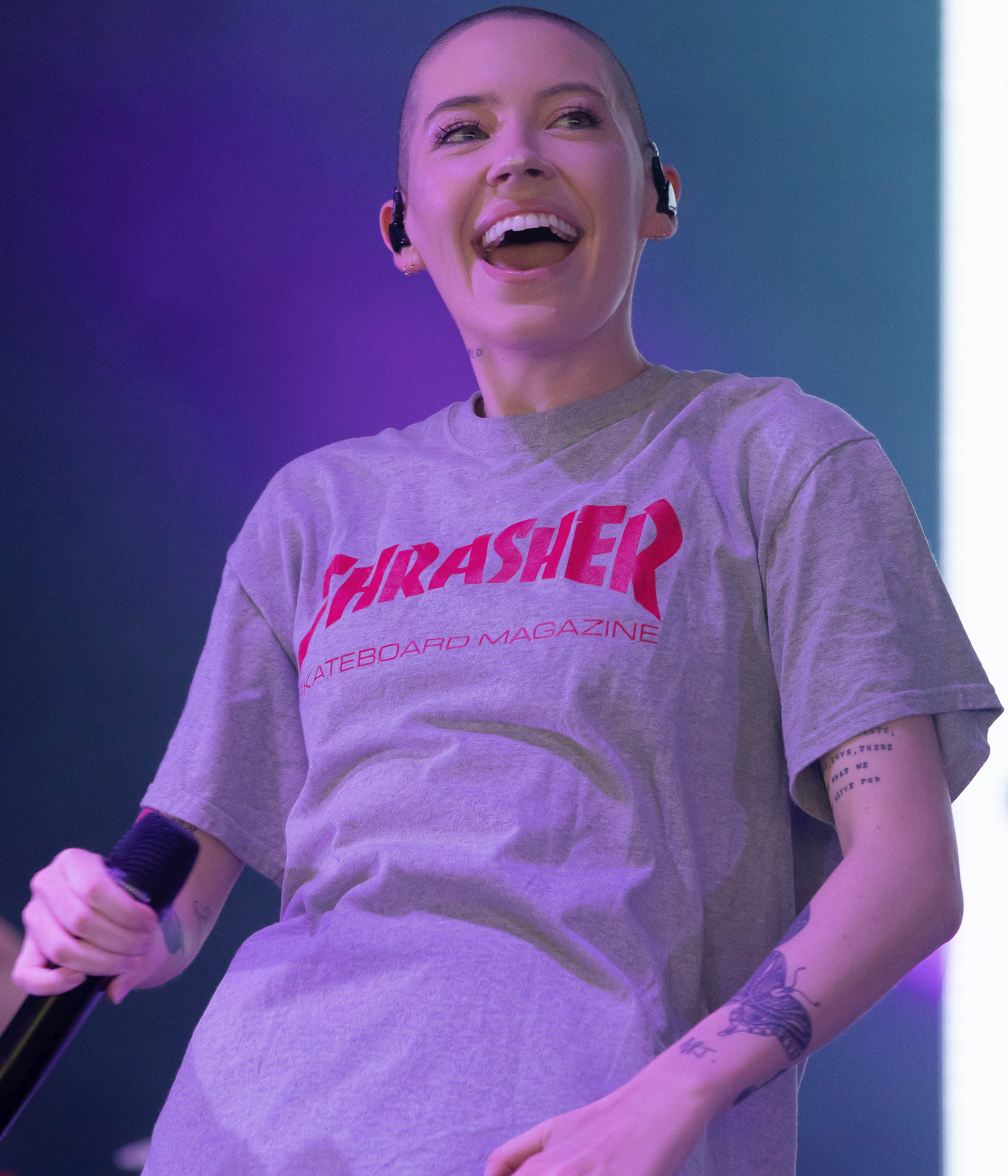
The celebrities who competed in the ninth season of The Masked Singer, pictured in order of elimination (L–R):
Dick Van Dyke ("Gnome"), Sara Evans ("Mustang"), Howie Mandel ("Rock Lobster"), Debbie Gibson ("Night Owl"), Grandmaster Flash ("Polar Bear"), Michael Bolton ("Wolf"), Malin Akerman ("Squirrel"), Lele Pons ("Jackalope"), Alexa Bliss ("Axolotl"), Holly Robinson Peete ("Fairy"), George Wendt ("Moose"), Christine Quinn ("Scorpio"), Dee Snider ("Doll"), Alicia Witt ("Dandelion"), Melissa Joan Hart ("Lamp"), Lou Diamond Phillips ("Mantis"), Keenan Allen ("Gargoyle"), Olivia Culpo ("UFO"), Pentatonix ("California Roll"), David Archuleta ("Macaw"), and Bishop Briggs ("Medusa")

== Episodes ==
=== Week 1 (February 15) ===
Performances on the first episode
| # | Stage name | Song | Identity | Result |
|---|---|---|---|---|
| 1 | Mustang | "Here I Go Again" by Whitesnake | undisclosed | SAFE |
| 2 | Gnome | "When You're Smiling" by Billie Holiday | Dick Van Dyke | OUT |
| 3 | Medusa | "Happier Than Ever" by Billie Eilish | undisclosed | SAFE |
Battle Royale
| 4 | Mustang | "Diamonds" by Rihanna | Sara Evans | OUT |
| 4 | Medusa | "Diamonds" by Rihanna | undisclosed | WIN |

- After being unmasked, Van Dyke sang "Supercalifragilisticexpialidocious" from Mary Poppins as his encore performance.

=== Week 2 (February 22) - "ABBA Night" ===
Performances on the second episode
| # | Stage name | ABBA song | Identity | Result |
|---|---|---|---|---|
| 1 | Medusa | "Dancing Queen" | undisclosed | SAFE |
| 2 | Night Owl | "Fernando" | undisclosed | SAFE |
| 3 | Rock Lobster | "SOS" | Howie Mandel | OUT |
Battle Royale
| 4 | Medusa | "The Winner Takes It All" | undisclosed | WIN |
| 4 | Night Owl | "The Winner Takes It All" | Debbie Gibson | OUT |

=== Week 3 (March 1) - "New York Night" ===
Guest performance: Panelist Robin Thicke performs "Living in New York City"

Performances on the third episode
| # | Stage name | Song | Identity | Result |
|---|---|---|---|---|
| 1 | Medusa | "New York, New York" by Frank Sinatra | undisclosed | SAFE |
| 2 | Polar Bear | "Rapture" by Blondie | Grandmaster Flash | OUT |
| 3 | California Roll | "Paparazzi" by Lady Gaga | undisclosed | SAFE |
Battle Royale
| 4 | Medusa | "Uptown Girl" by Billy Joel | undisclosed | KEPT |
| 4 | California Roll | "Uptown Girl" by Billy Joel | undisclosed | WIN |

- After being unmasked, Grandmaster Flash scratched along to "Good Times" by Chic as his encore performance.

=== Week 4 (March 8) - "DC Superheroes Night" ===
Guest performance: Panelist Nicole Scherzinger performs "Holding Out for a Hero" by Bonnie Tyler

Performances on the fourth episode
| # | Stage name | Song | Identity | Result |
|---|---|---|---|---|
| 1 | Gargoyle | "One Call Away" by Charlie Puth | undisclosed | SAFE |
| 2 | Wolf | "Break On Through" by The Doors | Michael Bolton | OUT |
| 3 | Squirrel | "Try" by P!nk | undisclosed | SAFE |
Battle Royale
| 4 | Gargoyle | "Kryptonite" by 3 Doors Down | undisclosed | KEPT |
| 4 | Squirrel | "Kryptonite" by 3 Doors Down | undisclosed | WIN |

- After being unmasked, Bolton performed his signature song "How Am I Supposed to Live Without You" as his encore performance.

=== Week 5 (March 15) - "Sesame Street Night" ===
Guest performance: Sesame Street characters (Note: Elmo, Big Bird, Cookie Monster, Grover, Abby Cadabby, and Count von Count) perform "Dynamite" by BTS

Performances on the fifth episode
| # | Stage name | Song | Identity | Result |
|---|---|---|---|---|
| 1 | Squirrel | "Just the Two of Us" by Grover Washington, Jr. feat. Bill Withers | Malin Akerman | OUT |
| 2 | Fairy | "You're No Good" by Linda Ronstadt | undisclosed | SAFE |
| 3 | Jackalope | "Whenever, Wherever" by Shakira | undisclosed | SAFE |
Battle Royale
| 4 | Jackalope | "On Top of the World" by Imagine Dragons | Lele Pons | OUT |
| 4 | Fairy | "On Top of the World" by Imagine Dragons | undisclosed | WIN |

=== Week 6 (March 22) - "Country Night" ===
Performances on the sixth episode
| # | Stage name | Song | Identity | Result |
|---|---|---|---|---|
| 1 | Fairy | "Angel from Montgomery" by Bonnie Raitt | undisclosed | SAFE |
| 2 | Axolotl | "Can't Fight the Moonlight" by LeAnn Rimes | Alexa Bliss | OUT |
| 3 | Macaw | "Live Like You Were Dying" by Tim McGraw | undisclosed | SAFE |
Battle Royale
| 4 | Fairy | "That Don't Impress Me Much" by Shania Twain | Holly Robinson Peete | OUT |
| 4 | Macaw | "That Don't Impress Me Much" by Shania Twain | undisclosed | WIN |

=== Week 7 (March 29) - "'80s Night" ===
Guest performance: Young MC performs "Bust a Move"

Performances on the seventh episode
| # | Stage name | Song | Identity | Result |
|---|---|---|---|---|
| 1 | Doll | "Don't You (Forget About Me)" by Simple Minds | undisclosed | SAFE |
| 2 | Scorpio | "Girls Just Want to Have Fun" by Cyndi Lauper | undisclosed | SAFE |
| 3 | Moose | "The Power of Love" by Huey Lewis & the News | George Wendt | OUT |
Battle Royale
| 4 | Scorpio | "Hungry Like the Wolf" by Duran Duran | Christine Quinn | OUT |
| 4 | Doll | "Hungry Like the Wolf" by Duran Duran | undisclosed | WIN |

=== Week 8 (April 5) - "WB Movie Night" ===
Performances on the eighth episode
| # | Stage name | Song | Identity | Result |
|---|---|---|---|---|
| 1 | Doll | "Jailhouse Rock" by Elvis Presley (from Elvis) | Dee Snider | OUT |
| 2 | Dandelion | "Over the Rainbow" by Judy Garland (from The Wizard of Oz) | undisclosed | SAFE |
| 3 | Mantis | "Old Time Rock and Roll" by Bob Seger (from Risky Business) | undisclosed | SAFE |
Battle Royale
| 4 | Dandelion | "(I've Got A) Golden Ticket" by Jack Albertson & Peter Ostrum (from Willy Wonka & the Chocolate Factory) | undisclosed | WIN |
| 4 | Mantis | "(I've Got A) Golden Ticket" by Jack Albertson & Peter Ostrum (from Willy Wonka & the Chocolate Factory) | undisclosed | KEPT |

- After being unmasked, Snider performed an acapella version of his signature song "We're Not Gonna Take It" as his encore performance.

=== Week 9 (April 12) - "Masked Singer In Space" ===
Performances on the ninth episode
| # | Stage name | Song | Identity | Result |
|---|---|---|---|---|
| 1 | Dandelion | "Starlight" by Muse | Alicia Witt | OUT |
| 2 | Lamp | "Venus" by Bananarama | undisclosed | SAFE |
| 3 | UFO | "Yellow" by Coldplay | undisclosed | SAFE |
Battle Royale
| 4 | Lamp | "Rocket Man" by Elton John | Melissa Joan Hart | OUT |
| 4 | UFO | "Rocket Man" by Elton John | undisclosed | WIN |

=== Week 10 (April 19) - "Supreme Six" ===
Performances on the tenth episode
| # | Stage name | Song |
|---|---|---|
| 1 | California Roll | "Total Eclipse of the Heart" by Bonnie Tyler |
| 2 | Macaw | "Photograph" by Ed Sheeran |
| 3 | UFO | "Stargazing" by Kygo |

=== Week 11 (April 26) - "Battle of the Saved" ===
Performances on the eleventh episode
| # | Stage name | Song | Identity | Result |
|---|---|---|---|---|
| 1 | Medusa | "Mercy" by Shawn Mendes | undisclosed | SAFE |
| 2 | Gargoyle | "DJ Got Us Fallin' in Love" by Usher ft. Pitbull | undisclosed | SAFE |
| 3 | Mantis | "You Really Got Me" by The Kinks | Lou Diamond Phillips | OUT |
Battle Royale
| 4 | Gargoyle | "Centuries" by Fall Out Boy | Keenan Allen | OUT |
| 4 | Medusa | "Centuries" by Fall Out Boy | undisclosed | WIN |

- After being unmasked, Phillips performed "La Bamba" by Ritchie Valens as his encore performance.

=== Week 12 (May 3) - "Quarter Finals" (British Invasion Night) ===
Performances on the twelfth episode
| # | Stage name | Song | Identity | Result |
|---|---|---|---|---|
| 1 | Macaw | "Your Song" by Elton John | undisclosed | SAFE |
| 2 | California Roll | "Creep" by Radiohead | undisclosed | SAFE |
| 3 | UFO | "Tears Dry on Their Own" by Amy Winehouse | Olivia Culpo | OUT |
| 4 | Medusa | "Someone like You" by Adele | undisclosed | SAFE |

=== Week 13 (May 10) - "Semi-Finals" ===
Performances on the thirteenth episode
| # | Stage name | Song | Identity | Result |
|---|---|---|---|---|
| 1 | California Roll | "Breakaway" by Kelly Clarkson | Pentatonix | OUT |
| 2 | Medusa | "Take Me to Church" by Hozier | undisclosed | SAFE |
| 3 | Macaw | "What Makes You Beautiful" by One Direction | undisclosed | SAFE |
| Battle Royale | "Runaway Baby" by Bruno Mars | | | |

=== Week 14 (May 17) - "Finale" ===
Performances on the fourteenth episode
| # | Stage name | Song | Identity | Result |
|---|---|---|---|---|
| 1 | Macaw | "Hold Back the River" by James Bay | David Archuleta | RUNNER-UP |
| 1 | Macaw | "All by Myself" by Eric Carmen | David Archuleta | RUNNER-UP |
| 2 | Medusa | "Elastic Heart" by Sia | Bishop Briggs | WINNER |
| 2 | Medusa | "Welcome to the Black Parade" by My Chemical Romance | Bishop Briggs | WINNER |

- After being unmasked, Briggs sang her signature song "River" as her encore performance.

== Ratings ==
Viewership and ratings per episode of The Masked Singer (American TV series) season 9
| No. | Title | Air date | Rating/share (18–49) | Viewers (millions) | Ref. |
|---|---|---|---|---|---|
| 1 | "Season 9 Premiere" | February 15, 2023 | 0.6/6 | 3.71 | |
| 2 | "ABBA Night" | February 22, 2023 | 0.6/6 | 3.83 | |
| 3 | "New York Night" | March 1, 2023 | 0.6/5 | 3.68 | |
| 4 | "DC Superheroes Night" | March 8, 2023 | 0.7/6 | 4.02 | |
| 5 | "Sesame Street Night" | March 15, 2023 | 0.7/6 | 4.01 | |
| 6 | "Country Night" | March 22, 2023 | 0.5/5 | 3.68 | |
| 7 | "'80s Night" | March 29, 2023 | 0.7/6 | 3.91 | |
| 8 | "WB Movie Night" | April 5, 2023 | 0.6/6 | 3.69 | |
| 9 | "Masked Singer in Space" | April 12, 2023 | 0.5/5 | 3.78 | |
| 10 | "Supreme Six" | April 19, 2023 | 0.5/5 | 3.45 | |
| 11 | "Battle of the Saved" | April 26, 2023 | 0.5/5 | 3.40 | |
| 12 | "Quarter Finals" | May 3, 2023 | 0.5/5 | 3.41 | |
| 13 | "Semi-Finals" | May 10, 2023 | 0.5/5 | 3.54 | |
| 14 | "Finale" | May 17, 2023 | 0.6/5 | 3.73 | |
