= Champion (Bishop Briggs album) =

Studio album by Bishop Briggs
- Released: 8 November 2019
- Length: 28:39
- Label: Island

Bishop Briggs chronology
Church of Scars (2018)	Champion (2019)	When Everything Went Dark (2023)

Singles from Champion
- 1. "Champion" Released: 17 July 2019; 2. "Tattooed on My Heart" Released: 24 July 2019; 3. "Jekyll & Hide" Released: 14 October 2019

Champion is the second studio album by English singer Bishop Briggs. It was released on 8 November 2019 under Island Records. In support of the album, Briggs announced a tour across North American and Europe, with support acts Miya Folick and Jax Anderson.

The first single from the album, "Champion" was released on 17 July 2019. The second single "Tattooed on My Heart" was released on 24 July 2019. "Jekyll & Hide", the third single, was released on 14 October 2019.

== Critical reception ==
Professional ratings
Aggregate scores
Source	Rating
Metacritic	69/100
Review scores
Source	Rating
AllMusic	3.5/5 stars
Exclaim!	8/10
Paste	6.5/10

Champion was met with generally favourable reviews from critics. At Metacritic, which assigns a weighted average rating out of 100 to reviews from mainstream publications, this release received an average score of 69, based on 4 reviews.

=== Accolades ===
Publication	Accolade	Rank	Ref.
Alternative Press	Top 50 Albums of 2019	N/A	
The Young Folks	Top 50 Albums of 2019	49	

== Track listing ==
Champion track listing
No.	Title	Length
1.	"I Still Love You"	1:23
2.	"Can You Hear Me Now?"	2:59
3.	"Champion"	2:53
4.	"Tattooed on My Heart"	3:21
5.	"Someone Else"	3:31
6.	"Jekyll & Hide"	3:16
7.	"Lonely"	3:00
8.	"Wild"	2:24
9.	"My Shine"	3:12
10.	"I Tried"	2:40
Total length:		28:39
