= Bishop Briggs =

English singer and songwriter (born 1992)

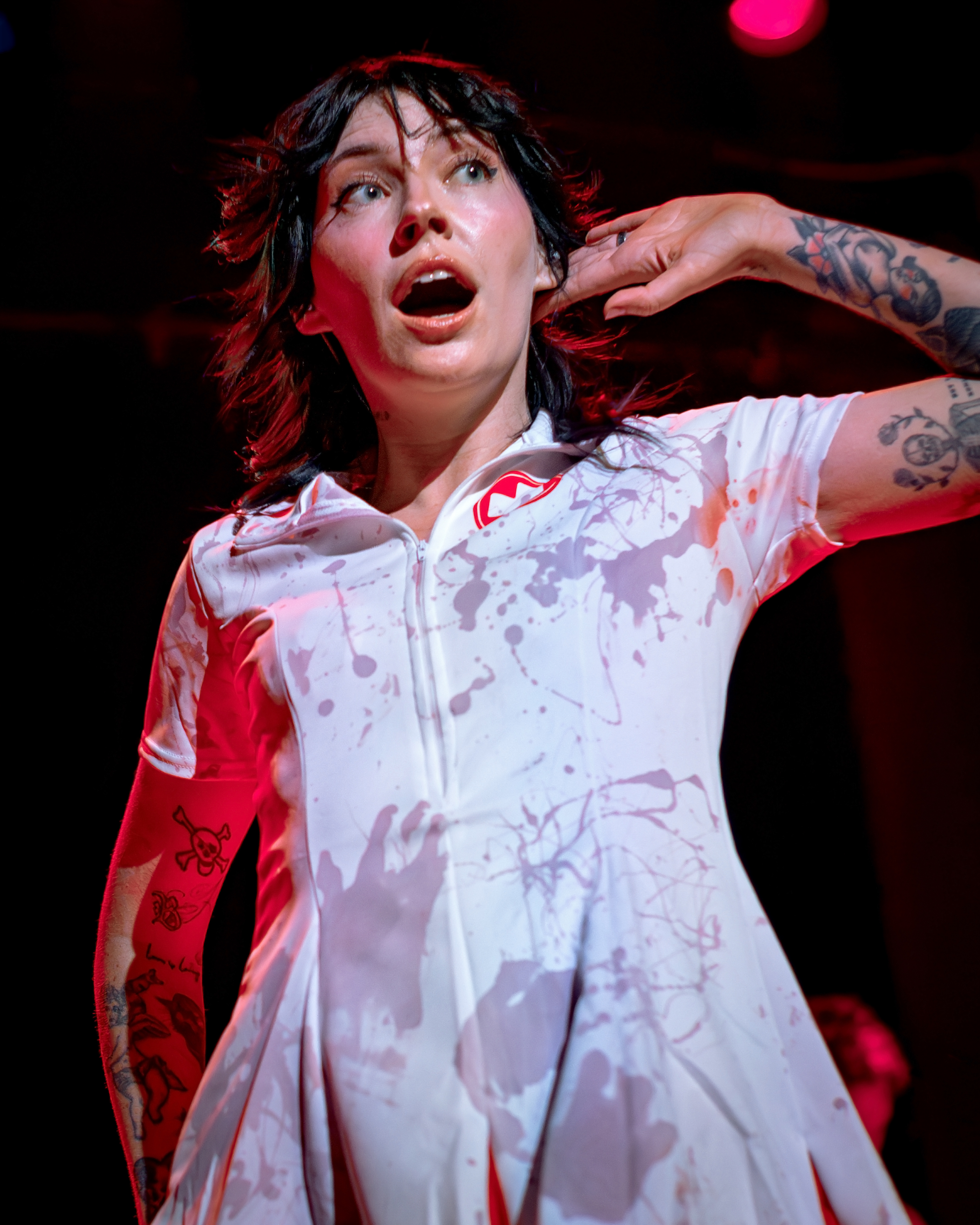
- Briggs in 2024

Background information
- Born: Sarah Grace McLaughlin; 18 July 1992 (age 34); London, England
- Genres: Alternative; electropop; indie pop
- Occupations: Singer; songwriter
- Years active: 2015–present
- Labels: Island; Arista Records
- Spouse: Landon Jacobs (m. 2021)
- Website: bishopbriggs.com

Sarah Grace McLaughlin (born 18 July 1992), known professionally as Bishop Briggs, is an English singer and songwriter. Her single "River" peaked at number 3 on the US Alternative Chart, and has been streamed more than 485 million times on Spotify. It was included on her debut album, Church of Scars, released in April 2018. Island Records released her second album, Champion, in July 2019, which was included in The Young Folks Top 50 albums of the year.

== Early life ==
Sarah Grace McLaughlin was born in London on 18 July 1992, the daughter of Scottish parents from the town of Bishopbriggs, which later inspired her stage name. At the age of four, she moved to Tokyo with her family. She sang in public for the first time at a Tokyo karaoke bar, and realised she wanted to be a performer. Growing up with the city's karaoke bar traditions and hearing music ranging from Motown musicians to The Beatles at home also inspired her to pursue music. She started writing her own songs at the age of seven, and would perform them for her family. She moved to Hong Kong at the age of 10, where she lived until she was 18. She continued to pursue music throughout her youth, training with vocal coach Christine Samson in Hong Kong, and participating in a number of school talent shows. After graduating from Hong Kong International School, she moved to Los Angeles and attended college at Musicians Institute.

== Career ==
=== 2015–2017: Debut singles and EP ===
After moving to Los Angeles, Briggs wrote and played all over the city in any venue she could, eventually recording her first single "Wild Horses" in July 2015. Many listeners found Briggs via Shazam when seeing an Acura commercial which features the song during the Super Bowl. In late 2015, "Wild Horses" began climbing the charts again, entering the top 30 on the Billboard Alternative Songs chart and top 13 on the Billboard Twitter Emerging Artist charts.

In January 2016, Briggs released the single "River". The song was a commercial success and reached number 1 on Hype Machine's Popular charts and on Spotify's US Viral 50 and No. 2 on the Global Viral 50, as well as hitting the Top 10 on three different Billboard charts. It also received an Honorable Mention on Shazam's predicted Songs of the Summer 2016, which was featured in Billboard. "River" climbed into the top 3 on the 'Billboard Alternative Songs chart and top 10 on the Billboard Hot Rock, Rock Airplay and Twitter Emerging Artist charts.

In May 2016, she released her third single, "The Way I Do". She was the opening act for Coldplay in the fall of 2016 on nine of their tour dates, and also opened for Kaleo throughout their fall tour. Briggs made her television debut on 1 August 2016, performing "River" on The Tonight Show Starring Jimmy Fallon. The video received more than 260 million views on YouTube. She released her fourth single, "Pray (Empty Gun)" on 12 August 2016. The song was featured in the season 2 finale of the MTV show Scream. On 23 September 2016, Briggs released the single "Be Your Love". Her first physical release was a self-titled 12" vinyl EP in a limited-edition run of 1,200 copies, released on Record Store Day Black Friday in 2016.

In December 2016, Briggs released the official video for "Wild Horses" through W Magazine.

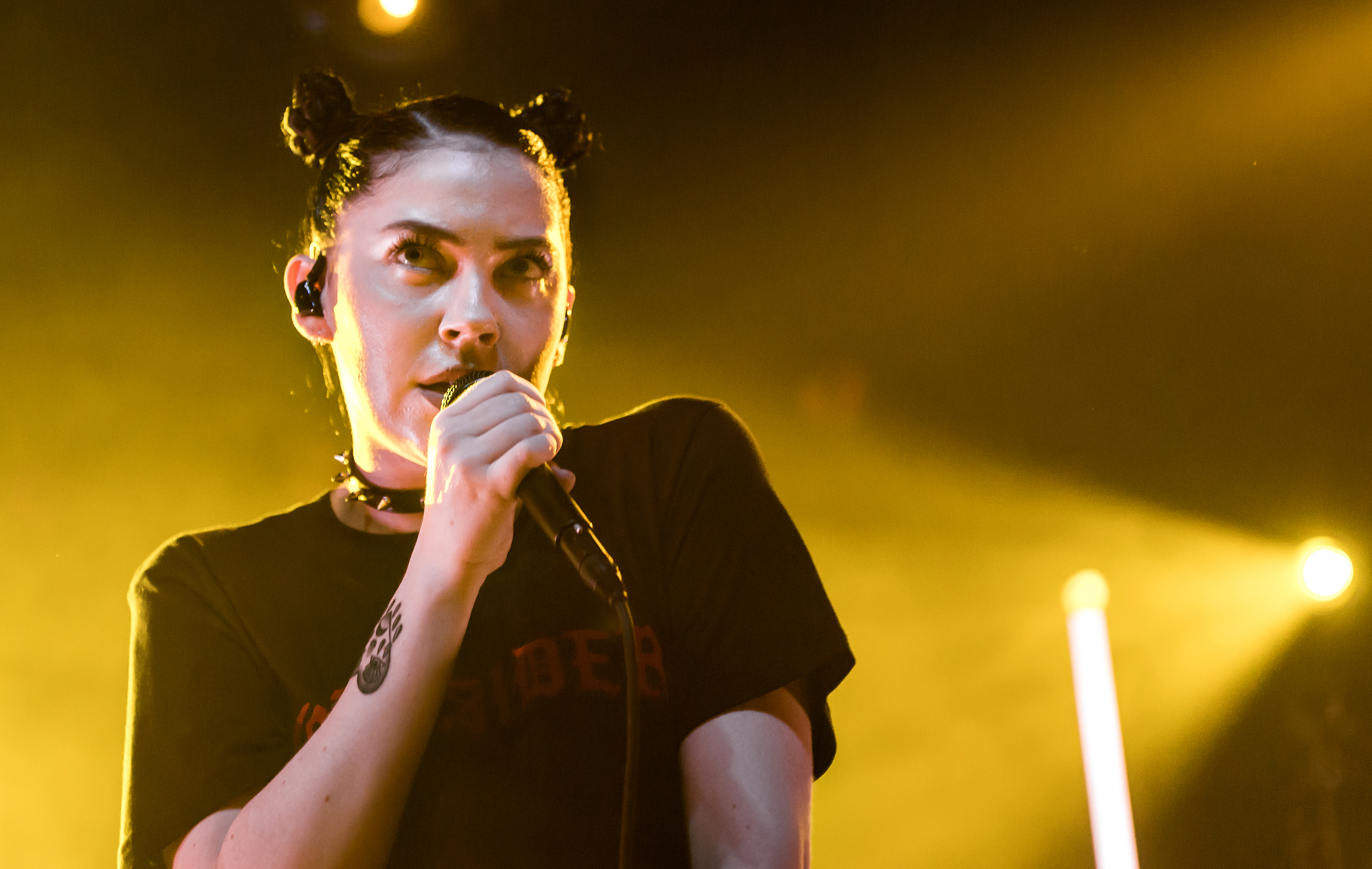
Bishop Briggs performing in 2017

Bishop Briggs opened on the main stage at the 2017 Panorama Festival in New York City and played Coachella 2017. Briggs contributed to the soundtrack of xXx: Return of Xander Cage with her song "Mercy". She featured in Cold War Kids' song "So Tied Up", released in March 2017.

Briggs' self-titled EP was re-released digitally on 14 April 2017, featuring four songs released on the vinyl EP and two previously unreleased songs, "Dark Side" and "The Fire". In 2020, "Dark Side" was heard in Avengers.

=== 2018: Church of Scars ===
Briggs' debut album, Church of Scars, was released on 20 April 2018.

=== 2019: Champion ===
In October 2019, Briggs released three songs as singles ("Champion", "Tattooed On My Heart" and "Jekyll & Hide") from her second studio album, Champion. In November, Briggs released the song "Someone Else" as part of the album. The album was then released on 8 November. The first single (and title track) received nearly 30 million streams on Spotify and third single "Jekyll & Hide" nearly 20 million.

=== 2020–2023: Singles and When Everything Went Dark ===
Briggs released several songs in response to the death of her older sister and manager Kate McLaughlin, who died of ovarian cancer at age 30 in January 2021. These included her songs "High Water" and "Art of Survival." She performed "High Water" on CBS' The Late Late Show with James Corden.

In May 2022 she performed at Coachella while in her third trimester of pregnancy, and in August she announced the birth of her first child. The single "Superhuman," released in October 2022, was a love letter to her son.

Also in 2022, her track "Revolution" was included as the second track on EA Games' NHL 23 soundtrack; for the holiday season she released the single "Cheer"; and her track "Lessons of the Fire" was the lead track to the Netflix series Devil in Ohio."

On 21 October 2022, "Superhuman" was featured in Times Square as part of the "Rise To" campaign "inviting brilliant young minds to continue to turn opportunities into action as they 'Rise To' face the world's most pressing issues."

In May 2023, a fall tour of Bishop Briggs/MisterWives co-headlining billed as "Don't Look Down" was announced.

Briggs also competed in season nine of The Masked Singer as "Medusa". After besting Dick Van Dyke as "Gnome" and Sara Evans as "Mustang" in the first episode, Howie Mandel as "Rock Lobster" and Debbie Gibson as "Night Owl" on "ABBA Night", she was defeated on "New York Night" by Pentatonix as "California Roll", but was saved by Nicole Scherzinger ringing the Ding Dong Keep It On Bell. Briggs as "Medusa" won the "Battle of the Saved" against Lou Diamond Phillips as "Mantis" and Keenan Allen as "Gargoyle." In the final, she defeated Pentatonix, who came in third place, and David Archuleta as "Macaw," who placed second. Bishop Briggs won the season, making her the first British and international singer to win. She also became the youngest winner in the show's history at the age of 30, beating out the record held by Teyana Taylor as "Firefly" in season seven. As an encore following her unmasking, Briggs performed "River".

Her EP When Everything Went Dark was released in June 2023 on Arista Records, including the single "Baggage".

== Discography ==
=== Studio albums ===
Title	Details	Peak chart positions					
Title	Details	AUS	CAN	SWI	US	US Alt.	US Rock
Church of Scars	Released: 20 April 2018; Label: Island; Format: CD, digital download, streaming, vinyl	91	56	90	29	5	5
Champion	Released: 8 November 2019; Label: Island; Format: CD, cassette, digital download, streaming, vinyl	—	—	—	—	—	—
Tell My Therapist I'm Fine	Released: 18 October 2024; Label: Terry Eighteen, Inc.; Format: CD, cassette, digital download, streaming, vinyl	—	—	—	—	—	—
"—" denotes recordings that did not chart or were not released.

=== Extended plays ===
Title	Extended play details	Peak chart positions		
Title	Extended play details	AUS Hit.	US Rock	US Heat.
Bishop Briggs	Released: 25 November 2016; Label: Island; Format: Vinyl	—	—	—
Bishop Briggs – EP	Released: 14 April 2017; Label: Island; Format: Digital download, CD, cassette	11	46	5
When Everything Went Dark	Released: 23 June 2023; Label: Arista; Format: Digital download, CD, cassette	—	—	—
"—" denotes recordings that did not chart or were not released.

=== Singles ===
List of singles by Bishop Briggs
Title	Year	Peak chart positions								Certifications	Album
Title	Year	UK DL	AUS Hit.	CAN Rock	CHN	SCO	SWI	US Alt.	US Rock	Certifications	Album
"Wild Horses"	2015	—	—	—	—	—	—	— (Note: "Wild Horses" did not enter the Alternative Airplay chart, but peaked at number 18 on the Alternative Digital Songs chart.)	— (Note: "Wild Horses" did not enter the Hot Rock & Alternative Songs chart, but peaked at number 22 on the Rock Digital Song Sales chart.)		Bishop Briggs and Church of Scars
"River"	2016	74	—	12	—	76	—	3	10	RIAA: 2× Platinum; BPI: Platinum; MC: Platinum	Bishop Briggs and Church of Scars
"The Way I Do"	2016	—	—	—	—	—	—	—	—		Bishop Briggs
"Pray (Empty Gun)"	2016	—	—	—	—	—	—	—	—		Non-album singles
"Be Your Love"	2016	—	—	—	—	—	—	—	39		Non-album singles
"Wild Horses" (re-release)	2016	—	—	38	—	—	—	17	21		Church of Scars
"The Way I Do" (re-release)	2017	—	—	—	—	—	—	—	—		Bishop Briggs
"Hi-Lo (Hollow)"	2017	—	—	—	—	—	—	—	—		Church of Scars
"Dream"	2017	—	—	45	—	—	—	25	30		Church of Scars
"Never Tear Us Apart"	2018	92	16	—	—	78	98	— (Note: "Never Tear Us Apart" did not enter the Alternative Airplay chart, but peaked at number 5 on the Alternative Digital Songs chart.)	18		Fifty Shades Freed OST
"White Flag"	2018	79	—	—	—	88	—	16	25	PMB: Gold	Church of Scars
"Baby"	2018	—	—	—	—	—	—	29	—		Non-album single
"Champion"	2019	—	—	39	16	—	—	22	20		Champion
"Tattoed on My Heart"	2019	—	—	—	—	—	—	—	—		Champion
"Jekyll & Hide"	2019	—	—	—	—	—	—	— (Note: "Jekyll & Hide" did not enter the Alternative Airplay chart, but peaked at number 18 on the Alternative Digital Songs chart.)	47		Champion
"We Will Rock You"	2020	—	—	—	—	—	—	—	—		Non-album singles
"Higher"	2020	—	—	—	—	—	—	— (Note: "Higher" did not enter the Alternative Airplay chart, but peaked at number 12 on the Alternative Digital Songs chart.)	—		Non-album singles
"Walk You Home"	2020	—	—	—	—	—	—	—	—		Non-album singles
"Someone Else" (featuring Jacob Banks)	2021	—	—	—	—	—	—	—	—		Non-album singles
"High Water"	2022	—	—	—	—	—	—	—	—		When Everything Went Dark
"Art of Survival"	2022	—	—	—	—	—	—	—	—		Non-album singles
"Revolution"	2022	—	—	—	—	—	—	—	—		Non-album singles
"Superhuman"	2022	—	—	—	—	—	—	—	—		When Everything Went Dark
"Cheer"	2022	—	—	—	—	—	—	—	—		Non-album single
"Baggage"	2023	—	—	49	—	—	—	—	—		When Everything Went Dark
"Triumph"	2024	—	—	—	—	—	—	—	—		Non-album single
"Mona Lisa on a Mattress"	2024	—	—	—	—	—	—	—	—		Tell My Therapist I'm Fine
"Good for Me"	2024	—	—	—	—	—	—	—	—		Tell My Therapist I'm Fine
"My Serotonin"	2024	—	—	—	—	—	—	32	—		Tell My Therapist I'm Fine
"Paint It, Black"	2024	—	—	—	—	—	—	—	—		Non-album single
"Woman Is King"	2025	—	—	—	—	—	—	—	—		Tell My Therapist I'm Fine (Deluxe)
"—" denotes recordings that did not chart or were not released.

=== Guest appearances ===
List of guest appearances, with other performing artists, showing year released and album name
Title	Year	Peak chart positions			Album
Title	Year	US Alt	US Rock	CAN Rock	Album
"So Tied Up" (Cold War Kids featuring Bishop Briggs)	2017	12	28	48	L.A. Divine
"Friends" (Moby Rich and Bishop Briggs)	2020	—	—	—	Non-album single
"—" denotes recordings that did not chart or were not released.

== Awards and nominations ==
Year	Award	Category	Nominated work	Result	Ref.
2018	MTV Europe Music Awards	Best Push		Nominated	
2019	Music Moves Europe Awards	Best Pop Artist		Won	
