= Church of Scars =

Studio album by Bishop Briggs
- Released: 20 April 2018
- Length: 33:37
- Label: Teleport; Island
- Producer: Dave Bassett; Mark Jackson; John Hill; Ian Scott; Dan Wilson

Bishop Briggs chronology
Bishop Briggs (2017)	Church of Scars (2018)	Champion (2019)

Singles from Church of Scars
- 1. "Wild Horses" Released: 5 December 2015; 2. "River" Released: 9 May 2016; 3. "Hi-Lo (Hollow)" Released: 7 May 2017; 4. "Dream" Released: 13 October 2017; 5. "White Flag" Released: 23 February 2018

Church of Scars is the debut studio album by English singer Bishop Briggs. The album was released on 20 April 2018 through Island Records.

== Critical reception ==
Professional ratings
Review scores
Source	Rating
Exclaim!	9/10
Slant	3/5 stars

In a rave review, Jenna Mohammed, writing for Exclaim! called McLaughlin's voice "immensely powerful". Mohammed described the album as "high-energy from start to finish", and that her "style and essence is very reminiscent of Florence + the Machine and Banks, but she sets herself apart through intense beat drops and her gospel choir roots". In a more mixed review, Sal Cinquemani, writing for Slant Magazine described the album as "largely joyless", saying that "across 10 tracks, though, Briggs's formula ultimately reveals itself to be one-note."

== Track listing ==
No.	Title	Writer(s)	Producer(s)	Length
1.	"Tempt My Trouble"	Sarah McLaughlin; Dave Bassett; Mark Andress Jackson; Ian Scott	Bassett; Jackson; Scott	3:13
2.	"River"	McLaughlin; Jackson; Scott	Jackson; Scott	3:36
3.	"Lyin'"	McLaughlin; Jackson; Dan Reynolds; Scott	Jackson; Scott	3:06
4.	"White Flag"	McLaughlin; Bassett; Jackson; Scott	Bassett; Jackson; Scott	3:50
5.	"Dream"	McLaughlin; Jackson; Scott; Dan Wilson	Jackson; Scott; Wilson	3:14
6.	"Wild Horses"	McLaughlin; Jackson; Scott	Jackson; Scott	3:09
7.	"Hallowed Ground"	McLaughlin; Jackson; Scott	Jackson; Scott	2:54
8.	"Water"	McLaughlin; Sean Douglas; John Hill; Wrabel	Hill; Rob Cohen^{[v]}	3:21
9.	"The Fire"	McLaughlin; Jackson; Scott	Jackson; Scott	3:03
10.	"Hi-Lo (Hollow)"	McLaughlin; Jackson; Scott	Jackson; Scott	4:11
Total length:				33:37

Church of Scars – Target exclusive bonus tracks
No.	Title	Writer(s)	Producer(s)	Length
11.	"Hold On"	McLaughlin; Jackson; Scott	Jackson; Scott	2:48
12.	"Dream" (Noah Neiman Remix)	McLaughlin; Jackson; Scott; Wilson	Jackson; Scott; Wilson; Noah Neiman^{[r]}	3:27
Total length:				39:52

Notes

- ^{^[v]} signifies a vocal producer.
- ^{^[r]} signifies a remixer.

== Personnel ==
Musicians

- Sarah McLaughlin – lead vocals (all tracks), background vocals (tracks 1, 2, 6, 7, 10)
- Mark Jackson – background vocals (tracks 1–4, 6, 7, 9, 10), electric guitar (1–3, 6, 7, 9), drum programming (1, 3, 4, 7, 9), keyboards (1, 3, 7), acoustic guitar (1, 3, 9), bass guitar (2, 6, 9, 10); drums, programming (2, 6, 10); percussion (2, 6), acoustic guitar (4), glockenspiel (9)
- Ian Scott – background vocals (tracks 1–4, 6, 7, 9, 10), keyboards (1–3, 6, 7, 9, 10), drum programming (1, 3, 4, 7, 9), organ (1, 7), glockenspiel (1); drums, programming (2, 6, 10); percussion (2, 6), piano (3), acoustic guitar (4), bass guitar (6)
- Dave Bassett – background vocals, drum programming (tracks 1, 4); bass guitar, electric guitar (1); piano (4)
- Dan Reynolds – background vocals (track 3)
- Sean Douglas – background vocals (track 8)
- Stephen Wrabel – background vocals (track 8)
- John Hill – guitar (track 8)
- Dave Palmer – keyboards (track 8)

Technical

- Stuart Hawkes – mastering
- Neal Avron – mixing (track 1)
- Mark Jackson – mixing (tracks 2, 3, 6, 7, 9, 10), engineering (1–7, 9, 10)
- Ian Scott – mixing (tracks 2, 3, 6, 7, 9, 10), engineering (1–7, 9, 10)
- Mark "Spike" Stent – mixing (tracks 4, 5)
- Dave Bassett – engineering (track 4)
- John Sinclair – engineering (track 5)
- Rob Cohen – engineering (track 8)
- Michael Freeman – mixing assistance (tracks 4, 5)
- Brian Brundage – engineering assistance (track 5)

'Visuals

- Ryan Rogers – art direction, design
- Jabari Jacobs – photography

== Charts ==
Chart performance for Church of Scars
Chart (2018)	Peak position
Australian Albums (ARIA)	91
Canadian Albums (Billboard)	56
Swiss Albums (Schweizer Hitparade)	90
US Billboard 200	29
US Top Alternative Albums (Billboard)	5
US Top Rock Albums (Billboard)	5
