= Love Is Mystical =

Single by Cold War Kids

from the album L.A. Divine
- Released: February 2, 2017
- Genre: Indie rock
- Length: 3:34
- Label: Capitol
- Songwriter: Cold War Kids
- Producer: Lars Stalfors

Cold War Kids singles chronology
"First" (2015)	"Love Is Mystical" (2017)	"Can We Hang On?" (2017)

Music video
- "Love Is Mystical" on YouTube

Cold War Kids - "Love Is Mystical"
An 18-second sample of the chorus of the song.

"Love Is Mystical" is a song by American indie rock band Cold War Kids. It is the lead single off their sixth album L.A. Divine (2017) and was released on February 2, 2017. It was the band's first release with Capitol Records.

The frontman, Nathan Willett, stated this about the song: "It’s about supernatural love — looking for inspiration and meaning, surrendering to feeling, love calling out your name and that journey we must go on to find it.” "Love Is Mystical" peaked at number two on the Billboard Alternative Songs chart. A music video was made for the single and was released on February 2, 2017.

== Song information ==
The song was inspired by a book called Falling Upward by Richard Rohr, a Franciscan friar. It was meant to capture Willett's relationship to Los Angeles, and he states, "LA became the backdrop and how being an artist in entertainment while being in a grounded relationship is like being pulled in two different directions. Also seeking spiritual and creative fulfilment and living in a materialistic, image based city can pull you in two directions."

== Critical reception ==
"Love Is Mystical" was given positive reviews. Exclaim! called it a "stomping single". Consequence of Sound described it as an "upbeat lead single punctuated by stomping piano." NME states that the song is "taking the band’s rousing and soulful anthemics to new heights."

== Music video ==
The music video was uploaded on the band's VEVO page on February 2, 2017. It was filmed in downtown Los Angeles at St. Vincent Court, directed by Phillip Lopez and choreographed by Amy Gardner. In the video, the band is accompanied by dancers who embrace one another and kiss.

== Live performances ==
The band performed the song on ABC's Jimmy Kimmel Live! on April 5, 2017.

== Charts ==
=== Weekly charts ===
Chart (2017)	Peak position
Belgium (Ultratip Bubbling Under Wallonia)	39
Canada Rock (Billboard)	4
Mexico Ingles Airplay (Billboard)	39
US Hot Rock & Alternative Songs (Billboard)	16
US Rock & Alternative Airplay (Billboard)	3

=== Year-end charts ===
Chart (2017)	Position
US Hot Rock & Alternative Songs (Billboard)	48
US Rock Airplay (Billboard)	13
