= L.A. Divine =

Studio album by Cold War Kids
- Released: April 7, 2017
- Recorded: 2016
- Genre: Indie rock
- Length: 43:13
- Label: Capitol
- Producer: Lars Stalfors

Cold War Kids chronology
Hold My Home (2014)	L.A. Divine (2017)	New Age Norms 1 (2019)

Singles from L.A Divine
- 1. "Love Is Mystical" Released: February 2, 2017; 2. "Can We Hang On?" Released: March 2, 2017; 3. "Restless" Released: April 6, 2017; 4. "So Tied Up" Released: August 8, 2017

L.A. Divine is the sixth studio album by American indie rock band Cold War Kids. It was released on April 7, 2017, through Capitol Records. It is the first album to feature lead guitarist David Quon, replacing Dann Gallucci.

== Background ==
The album name, a lyric from a song that did not make the record, reflects the recent rise of interest in Los Angeles "as a place where culture, restaurants and things are happening".

On the first single, "Love Is Mystical", Nathan Willett stated that "When you tour as much as we do, and you get back in the studio in the middle of it, you're kinda numb, it is hard to get that feeling back and this song was the real breakthrough. It's about supernatural love – looking for inspiration and meaning, surrendering to feeling, love calling out your name; that journey we must go on to find it."

== Singles ==
The first single from the album, "Love Is Mystical", was released on February 2, 2017. The second single, "Can We Hang On?" was released on March 2, 2017. The third single, "Restless", was released on April 6, 2017. The fourth single, "So Tied Up" featuring Bishop Briggs, was released on August 8, 2017.

== Critical reception ==
Professional ratings
Aggregate scores
Source	Rating
Metacritic	49/100
Review scores
Source	Rating
AllMusic	3.5/5 stars
DIY	2/5 stars
Paste	4.6/10

AllMusic's Heather Phares found the album as a whole "a little less consistent than Hold My Home," with its needless interludes and the band's overwhelming intensity but gave praise for recapturing that record's "solidly anthemic sound" while adding a bit of pop music to it that's "reminiscent of Fun," concluding that: "Nevertheless, L.A. Divine shows that Cold War Kids continue to expand their range – and if they're becoming more accessible with each album, it's on their own terms." Paste writer Scott Heisel found the album "frustrating in its monotonous insistence on making everything sound the same, simultaneously trying to land every single song on SiriusXM's Alt Nation channel but not focusing enough on developing the personality of any one track." Grant Rindner of DIY commented on the band's attempt to duplicate the sound they had with "First" saying "there's logic to what's going on here but it still feels unnatural." Rindner added that the record was "simply too rigid for Willett to shine", commenting that drummer Joe Plummer was less subtle in giving him "predictable, percussive grids that give his voice a jarringly artificial, almost showtune quality."

== Track listing ==
L.A. Divine track listing
No.	Title	Writer(s)	Length
1.	"Love Is Mystical"	Nathan Willett; Lars Stalfors; David Quon; Matthew Schwartz; Matthew Maust; Joe Plummer	3:34
2.	"Can We Hang On?"	Willett; Stalfors; Quon; Schwartz; Maust; Plummer	3:43
3.	"So Tied Up" (featuring Bishop Briggs)	Willett; Stalfors	3:09
4.	"Restless"	Willett; Stalfors	4:52
5.	"LA River"	Willett; Stalfors	1:07
6.	"No Reason to Run"	Willett; Stalfors; Schwartz; Quon; Plummer	3:12
7.	"Open Up the Heavens"	Willett; Stalfors; Quon; Maust; Schwartz; Plummer	3:38
8.	"Invincible"	Willett; Stalfors; Plummer; Maust; Schwartz	4:30
9.	"Wilshire Protest"	Willett; Stalfors	1:22
10.	"Luck Down"	Willett; Stalfors; Maust; Plummer; Schwartz	2:42
11.	"Ordinary Idols"	Willett; Stalfors; Maust; Schwartz; Quon; Plummer	3:30
12.	"Cameras Always On"	Willett; Stalfors	0:35
13.	"Part of the Night"	Willett; Stalfors; Dann Gallucci; Schwartz	4:00
14.	"Free to Breathe"	Willett; Stalfors; Dan Wilson	3:19

== Personnel ==
Credits adapted from the album's liner notes and Tidal.

=== Cold War Kids ===
- Matthew Maust – bass guitar (tracks 1–4, 6–8, 10, 11, 13), art direction
- David Quon – guitar (1–3, 6, 7), background vocals (1, 2, 6), keyboards (7), art direction
- Joe Plummer – art direction (Note: Joe Plummer was an official member of the band and co-wrote several songs on the album, but he is not attributed to any musical contributions.)
- Matthew Schwartz – background vocals (1–4, 6, 11, 13), keyboards (1–3, 6, 13), synthesizer programming (1), art direction
- Nathan Willett – vocals (all tracks), keyboards (1–13), guitar (1–4, 6–8, 10, 11, 13, 14), piano (1–4, 6–8, 10, 11, 13), organ (10), art direction

=== Additional contributors ===
- Lars Stalfors – production, mixing, engineering (all tracks); programming (1–4, 6–8, 10, 11, 13, 14), keyboards (2–4, 6, 8, 13), synthesizer programming (4, 10)
- Corin Roddick – additional production (3, 4)
- Dave Cerminara – engineering (1–4, 6–11, 13, 14)
- Joe LaPorta – mastering
- Nathan Warkentin – art direction
- Dan Monick – photography
- Monica Reyes – additional photography
- Matthew Compton – drums, percussion (1–4, 6–8, 10, 11, 13)
- Bishop Briggs – vocals (3)
- Dann Gallucci – guitar (13)
- Dan Wilson – keyboards (14)

== Charts ==
Chart performance for L.A. Divine
Chart (2017)	Peak position
US Billboard 200	69
US Top Alternative Albums (Billboard)	9
US Top Rock Albums (Billboard)	10
