= River (Bishop Briggs song) =

2016 single by Bishop Briggs

Single by Bishop Briggs

from the EP Bishop Briggs and the album Church of Scars
- Released: 22 January 2016
- Length: 3:40
- Label: Teleport; Island
- Songwriters: Bishop Briggs; Ian Scott; Mark Jackson
- Producers: Ian Scott; Mark Jackson

Bishop Briggs singles chronology
"Wild Horses" (2015)	"River" (2016)	"The Way I Do" (2016)

Music video
- River on YouTube

"River" is a song by English singer-songwriter Bishop Briggs, released on 22 January 2016 through Teleport Records and Island Records. Initially, it was released on the artist's SoundCloud. It is the second single released on Briggs's debut album Church of Scars. In May 2016, it was incorporated into the official soundtrack album for MTV's Scream Season 2, appearing throughout the season, and re-released with Scream: Music from Season Two on July 29, 2016, under Island Records.

The song became a hit and reached top 10 on three different Billboard charts as well as number one on the Spotify US Viral 50.

== Background ==
The song is about a strained relationship that is on the edge of failure. Bishop Briggs stated that the lyrics of the song “was all about the tension…My hope with that song is it makes people feel empowered [to] take things into their own hands. I always have the visual, especially when I was writing it, to go up to someone's face and egg them on, and ask them to push you to your limits. I think there is something strong and exciting about that."

== Composition ==
Bishop Briggs – "River"
A 19-second sample of the song.

The song starts with "a whipping percussion", before it "transitions into an explosive chorus highlighting Briggs's fierce, soulful-rocker vocals". Vice felt that the song was "seemingly birthed by witches off the Bayou, bearing handclaps like reddening thigh slaps and boasting a topline that allows Bishop to truly exercise her range."

== Music video ==
The music video was directed by Jungle George. Bishop Briggs stated the video was "about embracing my inner demons and setting them loose." It begins with an opening shot of Bishop Briggs sinking in water. In the video, there is a scene where she convulses and another where she is wearing a bag over her head.

== Critical reception ==
Brooklyn Magazine stated that it is “an explosive track with the potential to be a massive radio hit. It will leave you feeling empowered with surging bass and skyward vocals.” Antonio Beliveau in Life & News wrote, “Simple. Space. Repetition. Straight to the point… It’s not a song that goes into my iTunes after hearing it even for the third time. But there’s a lot to appreciate about this cut.” Hooligan Magazine, said, “Parts of this track suck the air right out of the room, but Briggs never fails to throw us right back into the mix with her smooth guitar playing and slick voice. “River” has something for everybody.”

== Live performances ==
In her television debut, Bishop Briggs performed the song on The Tonight Show Starring Jimmy Fallon on August 1, 2016.

On January 1, 2026, she performed the song in the opening number of the 137th Rose Parade in Pasadena, California.

== Cover versions ==
In live shows starting in 2017, Pink has frequently covered "River." She did so on some stops of her 2018–2019 Beautiful Trauma World Tour, including on her live album All I Know So Far: Setlist. It is frequently covered on reality competition shows.

== Charts ==
=== Weekly charts ===
Chart performance for "River"
Chart (2016)	Peak position
Canada Rock (Billboard)	12
US Hot Rock & Alternative Songs (Billboard)	10
US Rock & Alternative Airplay (Billboard)	5

=== Year-end charts ===
Chart performance for "River"
Chart (2016)	Position
US Hot Rock Songs (Billboard)	27
US Rock Airplay (Billboard)	13

== Certifications ==
Certifications for "River"
Region	Certification	Certified units/sales
Brazil (Pro-Música Brasil)	Diamond	250,000^{‡}
Canada (Music Canada)	Platinum	80,000^{‡}
Denmark (IFPI Danmark)	Gold	45,000^{‡}
Germany (BVMI)	Gold	200,000^{‡}
Poland (ZPAV)	Platinum	50,000^{‡}
United Kingdom (BPI)	Platinum	600,000^{‡}
United States (RIAA)	2× Platinum	2,000,000^{‡}
^{‡} Sales+streaming figures based on certification alone.
